= Albert Lowerson =

Recipient of the Victoria Cross

Albert Lowerson VC
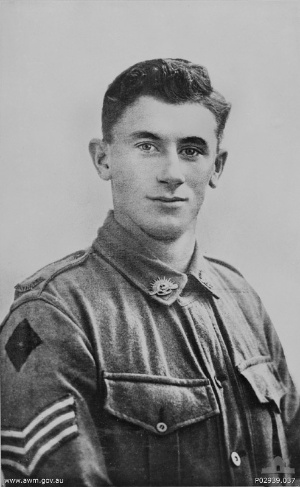
- Sergeant Alby Lowerson, c. 1916
- Born: 2 August 1896; Myrtleford, Victoria
- Died: 15 December 1945 (aged 49); Myrtleford, Victoria
- Burial place: Waverley Cemetery
- Military career
- Allegiance: Australia
- Branch: Australian Army
- Service years: 1915–19; 1940–44
- Rank: Sergeant
- Nickname: Alby
- Units: 21st Battalion (1915–19)
- Conflicts: First World War; Battle of Pozières; Battle of Mouquet Farm; Battle of Mont St. Quentin; Second World War
- Awards: Victoria Cross

Albert David "Alby" Lowerson, VC (2 August 1896 – 15 December 1945) was an Australian recipient of the Victoria Cross, the highest award for gallantry in the face of the enemy that can be awarded to British and Commonwealth forces.

== Early life ==
Albert Lowerson, nicknamed Alby, was born in Myrtleford, a town in the state of Victoria, on 2 August 1896. His father worked for the railways as an engine driver but later turned his hand to farming. Lowerson worked as a gold miner after leaving school.

== First World War ==
In July 1915, Lowerson joined the Australian Imperial Force. After initial training, he embarked for the Middle East in September 1915 as a reinforcement for 21st Battalion. He arrived too late to participate in the Gallipoli Campaign and in March 1916 proceeded with his battalion to the Western Front. He fought in the Battles of the Somme, Pozières and Mouquet Farm, the latter of which saw him wounded. He was also recommended for the Military Medal for his work at Pozières but this was not awarded. After a month recovering from his wounds he rejoined his battalion and shortly afterwards was promoted to corporal. Promoted in April 1917 to acting sergeant, he was again wounded, this time during the Second Battle of Bullecourt.

Lowerson's promotion to sergeant was made permanent while he was still recovering from his wounding at Bullecourt. He rejoined his battalion in November 1917. On 1 September 1918, during the Battle of Mont St Quentin, 21st Battalion supported 23rd and 24th Battalions in an attack towards the village of Mont St Quentin. Lowerson's company was held up in its advance on the flank of the village and, with a party of seven men, attacked and captured a strong point from which heavy machinegun fire was directed towards the advancing Australians. The advance was able to continue. Lowerson, wounded, was sent to the rear but it was a further two days before he was dispatched to a hospital.

After his wounding at St Quentin, Lowerson returned to his unit in September 1918 but received his fourth wound the following month and took no further part in the war. The award of his VC for his actions at St Quentin was gazetted on 14 December 1918 and he was presented with it by King George V on 1 March 1919. The citation for his VC read:

For most conspicuous bravery and tactical skill on the 1st September, 1918, during the attack on Mt. St. Quentin, north of Peronne, when very strong opposition was met with early in the attack, and every foot of ground was stubbornly contested by the enemy. Regardless of heavy enemy machine gun fire, Sergeant Lowerson moved about fearlessly directing his men, encouraging them to still greater effort, and finally led them on to the objective. On reaching the objective he saw that the left attacking party was held up by an enemy strong post heavily manned with twelve machine guns. Under the heaviest sniping and machine gun fire, Sergeant Lowerson rallied seven men as a storming party, and directing them to attack the flanks of the post, rushed the strong point, and, by effective bombing, captured it, together with twelve machine guns and thirty prisoners. Though severely wounded in the right thigh, he refused to leave the front line until the prisoners had been disposed of, and the organization and consolidation of the post had been thoroughly completed. Throughout a week of operations, his leadership and example had a continual influence on the men serving under him, whilst his prompt and effective action at a critical juncture allowed the forward movement to be carried on without delay, thus ensuring the success of the attack.

— The London Gazette, 13 December 1918

== Later life and legacy ==
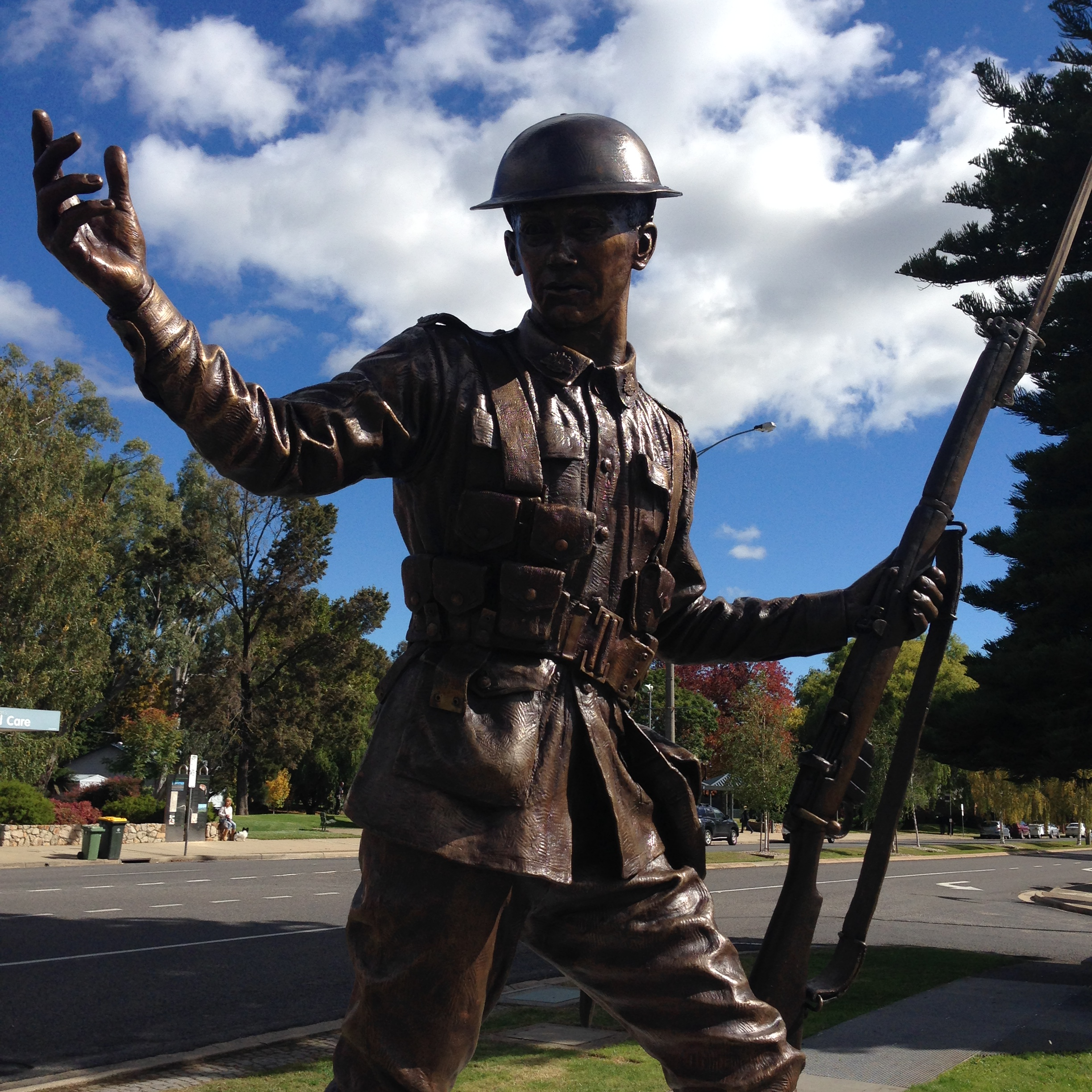
Alby Lowerson VC Memorial statue

Lowerson left for Australia in April 1919 and was discharged from the AIF three months later. Like his father, Lowerson became a farmer and worked a block of land, which he named St. Quentin, near Myrtleford and which he converted to tobacco and dairy. He married in 1930 and had a daughter. After the outbreak of the Second World War, he rejoined the Australian Army but his old war wounds confined him to service on the home front as a sergeant with a number of training battalions. He was serving with 2/8 Training Battalion when he was discharged from service in 1944 but became ill with leukemia the following year. He died on 15 December 1945. Buried in Myrtleford, he was survived by his wife and daughter.

On 23 April 2015 a memorial statue was unveiled in Myrtleford. Lowerson's VC is held at the Australian War Memorial in Canberra. He was also entitled for the 1914–15 Star, the British War Medal and the Victory Medal.
