= Ewen Sinclair-MacLagan =

British general

Major-General Ewen Sinclair-MacLagan CB CMG DSO
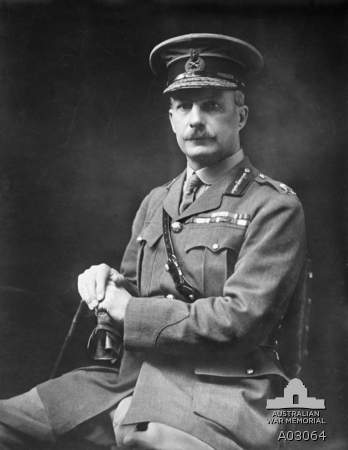
- Born: 24 December 1868; Edinburgh, Scotland
- Died: 24 November 1948 (aged 79); Dundee, Scotland
- Military career
- Allegiance: United Kingdom
- Branch: British Army; Australian Army
- Service years: 1889–1925
- Rank: Major General
- Commands: 51st (Highland) Division (1919–1923); 4th Division (1917–1919); 3rd Brigade (1914–1916)
- Conflicts: North-West Frontier; Second Boer War; First World War; Gallipoli campaign; Western Front
- Awards: Companion of the Order of the Bath; Companion of the Order of St Michael and St George; Distinguished Service Order; Mentioned in dispatches (5); Army Distinguished Service Medal (United States); Croix de guerre (France); Commander's Cross of the Order of the White Eagle (Serbia)

Major General Ewen George Sinclair-MacLagan, CB, CMG, DSO (24 December 1868 – 24 November 1948) was an officer in the British Army who fought in British India and the Second Boer War. He was later seconded to the Australian Army and served with the Australian Imperial Force during the First World War. During the latter stages of the war, he commanded the 4th Australian Division. After the war, he returned to service with the British Army. He retired from military service in 1925 and died in Dundee, Scotland at the age of 79 in 1948.

== Early life ==
Ewen George Sinclair-MacLagan was born in Edinburgh, Scotland on 24 December 1868 to the banker Robert Ewen Sinclair-Maclagan and his wife Mary Alice Wall. He attended the United Services College in North Devon, England, where Rudyard Kipling was one of his classmates.

== Early military career ==
After serving in the 5th (Militia) Battalion of the Royal Dublin Fusiliers, into which he had been commissioned in February 1887, Sinclair-MacLagan was promoted to lieutenant in April 1888 and was commissioned as a second lieutenant in the Border Regiment, and the Regular Army, in December 1889.

He served in British India and participated in campaigns in the Waziristan region. He was promoted to captain in May 1898.

From 1899 to 1901 he fought in the Second Boer War in South Africa where, as a captain, he served as a company commander in the 1st Battalion of the Border Regiment. During his service in the war, he was mentioned in dispatches and received the Distinguished Service Order (DSO).

In 1901, Sinclair-MacLagan was seconded to the Australian Army and served as adjutant of the New South Wales Scottish Rifles. After three years in Australia, he returned to his regiment in England. He was on 1 February 1905 promoted from supernumerary lieutenant captain to captain. In June 1906 he was appointed an adjutant.

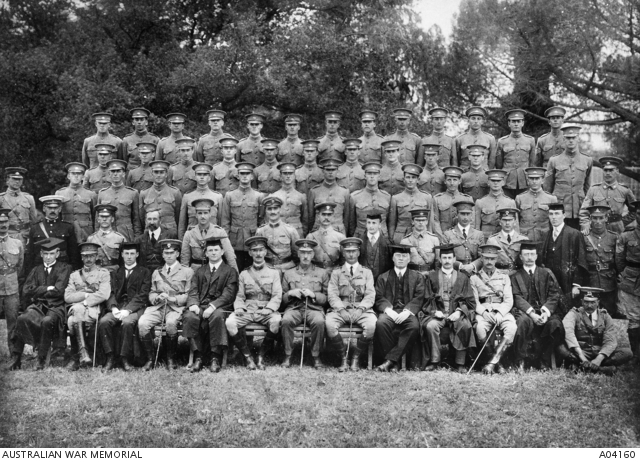
Group portrait of members of the second class at the Royal Military College, Duntroon, with their officers and sergeant majors, December 1913. Brigadier General W. T. Bridges, the college's commandant, is sat in the centre of the front row. To his left is Lieutenant Colonel Sinclair-MacLagan

In 1910, he was a major and serving with the Yorkshire Regiment when the-then Brigadier William Bridges, who knew Sinclair-MacLagan from his time in Australia, offered him a position as a drill instructor at the newly established Royal Military College at Duntroon. Sinclair-MacLagan accepted the position and returned to Australia as a temporary lieutenant colonel in January 1911.

== First World War ==
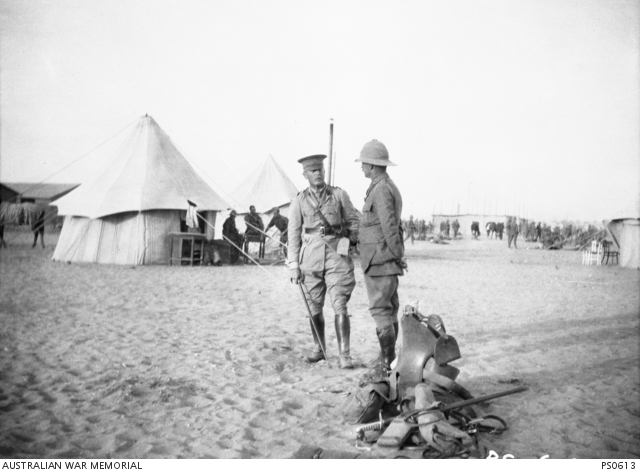
Colonel James Whiteside McCay (right, wearing pith helmet) in conversation with Colonel Sinclair-MacLagan, commanding the 3rd Brigade, pictured here in either 1914 or 1915

Upon the outbreak of the First World War in August 1914, Bridges was instructed to form the Australian Imperial Force (AIF) for service overseas. He selected Sinclair-MacLagan to be the commander of the 3rd Brigade, 1st Division which Bridges would command as its first general officer commanding. Sinclair-MacLagan was the only brigade commander of the division to be a professional soldier. He oversaw the training of the brigade, most of whom were miners, in the Middle East.

=== Gallipoli ===
Sinclair-MacLagan's brigade was selected to be the lead element of the division when it landed at Gallipoli on 25 April 1915. On reaching the high ground at Plugge's Plateau, he quickly realised that his brigade had been landed in the wrong position. Making the best of a confusing situation, he directed his forces to secure Baby 700, a prominent feature overlooking the ANZAC positions. This could not be done, and he opted to establish positions on what would become known as the Second Ridge.

Exhausted after dealing with Turkish counterattacks the following day, he was relieved of his command. After a period of rest, Sinclair-MacLagan returned to his brigade but was medically evacuated in August. He was promoted to temporary brigadier general around this time, dated back to 15 August 1914. His substantive rank was made up to lieutenant colonel in March and brevet colonel in June. He resumed command of the brigade in January 1916, at which stage it was reforming in Egypt after being evacuated from Gallipoli.

=== Western Front ===
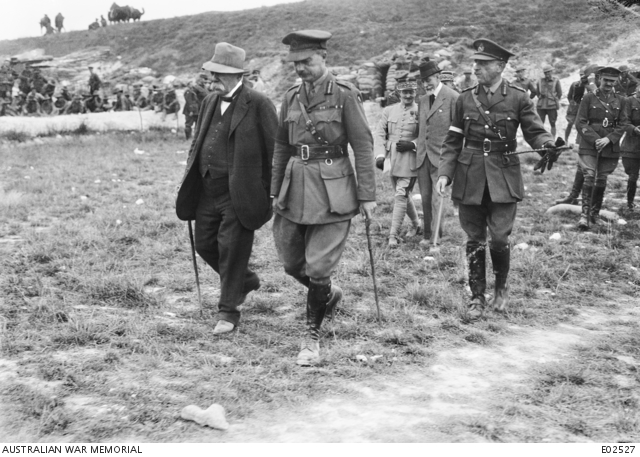
Georges Clemenceau, premier of France (left), during his only visit to the Australian front, walking with Sinclair-MacLagan and Lieutenant General Sir John Monash, GOC Australian Corps (right, foreground). At far right is Lieutenant Colonel John Lavarack, the division's senior staff officer

The 3rd Brigade, with Sinclair-MacLagan still in command, participated in the battles of Pozières and Mouquet Farm from July to September 1916. He left his brigade in December to become commander of the AIF depots in England. He was appointed a Companion of the Order of the Bath in February 1917 for his war service to date. He became director of military training in June but returned to the Western Front the next month when the commander of the 4th Division, Major General William Holmes, was killed shortly after the Battle of Messines. Sinclair-MacLagan was to take over command of the division, which he would lead for the remainder of the war.

Promoted to temporary major general that month, Sinclair-MacLagan had little opportunity to stamp his mark on the division before the upcoming Battle of Passchendaele, but it performed well in the Battle of Polygon Wood. Its next major engagement was in March 1918 when it was rushed to the Somme sector to counter the German spring offensive. It took up positions on the Ancre and rebuffed several attempts by the Germans to break through. In September, the 4th Division relieved the 5th Division in the line and participated in the attacks on the Hindenburg Line. He also led the Australian mission that assisted in the training of the II Corps of the American Expeditionary Forces (AEF) prior to its participation in the successful Battle of St. Quentin Canal.

The Armistice of 11 November 1918 brought the war to an end. For his services Sinclair-MacLagan was mentioned in dispatches five times throughout the war and was one of five British officers seconded to serve with Australian forces for the duration of the conflict.

== Post-war ==
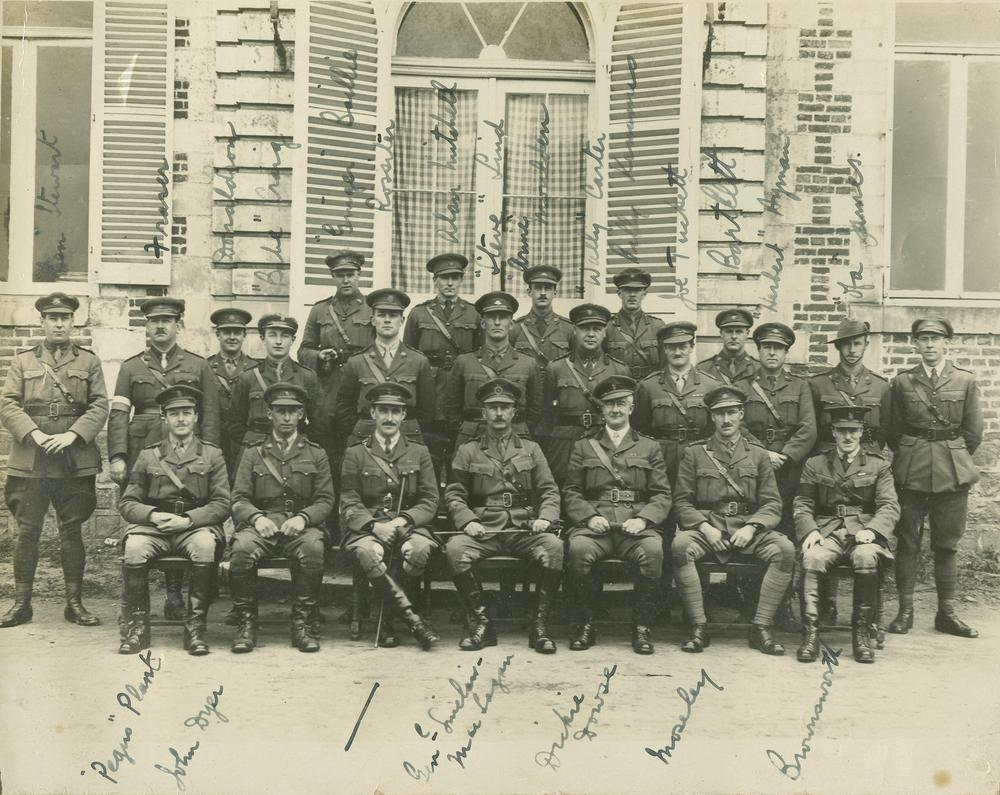
Senior officers of the 4th Australian Division in France, 1919. The division's GOC, Major General Sinclair-MacLagan, is seated in the centre of the front row.

After the war, Sinclair-MacLagan's rank of major general was made substantive in January 1919, in lieu of the knighthood that other divisional commanders of the AIF received. In May, his service with the AIF was terminated. He received a number of awards for his wartime services. His time assisting the AEF was rewarded with the Army Distinguished Service Medal. He also received the Croix de guerre with palm from the French government, and the Commander's Cross of the Order of the White Eagle from the Serbian government. In late 1919, he was appointed a Companion of the Order of St Michael and St George.

== Later life ==
Sinclair-MacLagan returned to duty with the British Army and served as commander of the 51st (Highland) Division, a Territorial Army formation, before retiring from the army in 1925. He retained a connection to the Australian Army through his honorary colonelcy of the 34th Battalion. He succeeded General Sir Bruce Hamilton in the ceremonial role of colonel of the Border Regiment in August 1923. He would hold this important post until 1936.

He died at the age of 79 in Dundee, Scotland on 24 November 1948. He was survived by his daughter, the only child of his marriage to Edith Kathleen French, the daughter of George Arthur French. His wife had died in 1928.

== Notes ==
Military offices
| Preceded by George Carter-Campbell | GOC 51st (Highland) Division; 1919–1923 | Succeeded by Archibald Ritchie |
Honorary titles
| Preceded by Sir Bruce Hamilton | Colonel of the Border Regiment; 1923–1936 | Succeeded by George Hyde Harrison |
