= Robert MacTier =

Robert Mactier VC
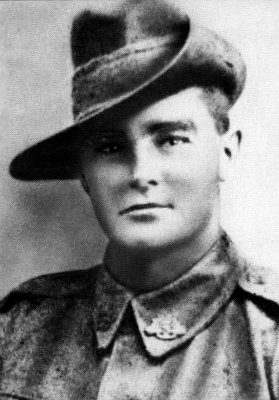
- Robert Mactier
- Born: 17 May 1890; Tatura, Australia
- Died: 1 September 1918 (aged 28); Mont St Quentin, France
- Burial place: Hem Farm Military Cemetery, near Péronne
- Military career
- Allegiance: Australia
- Branch: Australian Imperial Force
- Service years: 1917–18
- Rank: Private
- Units: 23rd Battalion
- Conflicts: First World War; Western Front; Battle of Hamel; Hundred Days Offensive; Battle of Albert (WIA); Second Battle of the Somme; Battle of Mont St Quentin †
- Awards: Victoria Cross

Robert "Bob" Mactier, VC (17 May 1890 – 1 September 1918) was an Australian recipient of the Victoria Cross, the highest award for gallantry in the face of the enemy that can be awarded to British and Commonwealth forces. He was one of 64 Australians to receive the award for their actions during the First World War, receiving it as a result of deeds performed during the Battle of Mont St Quentin on 1 September 1918. That day, Mactier was a battalion runner serving with the 23rd Battalion, Australian Imperial Force. He was sent forward by an officer to determine the cause of a delay in the battalion moving into its jumping off position. The cause was a well placed enemy machine gun. On his own initiative, Mactier jumped out of the trench and charged the gun, killing its crew of six. He then charged two other machine guns, killing more crews and causing at least 40 enemy to surrender. He was killed by fire from a fourth machine gun, but not before enabling his battalion to form up on time.

== Early life ==
Robert Mactier was born at Tatura, Victoria, on 17 May 1890, the seventh of ten children of Robert and Christina Mactier of "Reitcam" ("Mactier" spelt backwards), a nearby property. In his formative years, he was a keen sportsman. He went to school locally, and later worked on his father's properties until he enlisted in the Australian Imperial Force at Seymour on 1 March 1917. He sailed from Melbourne with the other 151 Victorians of the 23rd Battalion's 19th Reinforcements aboard HMAT A11 Ascanius on 11 May. He arrived in France on 14 November, and joined the battalion on 23 November. Posted to B Company, he fought in all of the battalion's subsequent battles until his death, including at Hamel, the August Offensive and Albert, where he was gassed. His brother, David, served with the 37th Battalion.

== Victoria Cross action ==
He was 28 years old, and a private in the 23rd Battalion when the following deed took place for which he was posthumously awarded the Victoria Cross. The full citation for the Victoria Cross appeared in a supplement to the London Gazette on 13 December 1918:

War Office, 14th December, 1918

His Majesty the KING has been graciously pleased to award the Victoria Cross to the undermentioned Officers, Warrant Officer, Non-commissioned Officers and Men:-

No. 6939 Pte. Robert Mactier, late 23rd Bn., A.I.F.

'For most conspicuous bravery and devotion to duty on the morning of the 1st September, 1918, during the attack on the village of Mt. St. Quentin. Prior to the advance of the battalion, it was necessary to clear up several enemy strong points close to our line. This the bombing patrols sent forward failed to effect, and the battalion was unable to move. Private Mactier, single handed, and in daylight, thereupon jumped out of the trench, rushed past the block, closed with and killed the machine gun garrison of eight men with his revolver and bombs, and threw the enemy machine gun over the parapet. Then, rushing forward about 20 yards, he jumped into another strong point held by a garrison of six men, who immediately surrendered. Continuing to the next block through the trench, he disposed of an enemy machine gun which had been enfilading our flank advancing troops, and was then killed by another machine gun at close range. It was entirely due to this exceptional valour and determination of Private Mactier that the battalion was able to move on to its "jumping off" trench and carry out the successful operation of capturing the village of Mt. St. Quentin a few hours later.'

Mactier was buried nearby at Clery but in 1924, he was reinterred in the Hem Farm Military Cemetery near Péronne, France. Mactier's actions have been described as "a remarkable one-man offensive". He was unmarried.

== Legacy ==
Mactier has been commemorated in numerous ways. In his home town of Tatura there is a stained glass window in St Andrews Church dedicated to the memory of Mactier and his parents. The Robert Mactier VC Memorial Garden, commonly known as Mactier Park, is also named after him. In 1956, his two sisters represented him at the Victoria Cross centenary in London. The soldiers' club at Simpson Barracks, Watsonia was later named the "Mactier VC Club" in his honour. It also holds a bust of him by Wallace Anderson. Mactier's Victoria Cross was presented to the Australian War Memorial, in Canberra by his family in 1983, where it is now on display. His name is recorded on panel 99 of the Roll of Honour in the Commemorative Area at the Australian War Memorial.
