= 21st Battalion (Australia) =

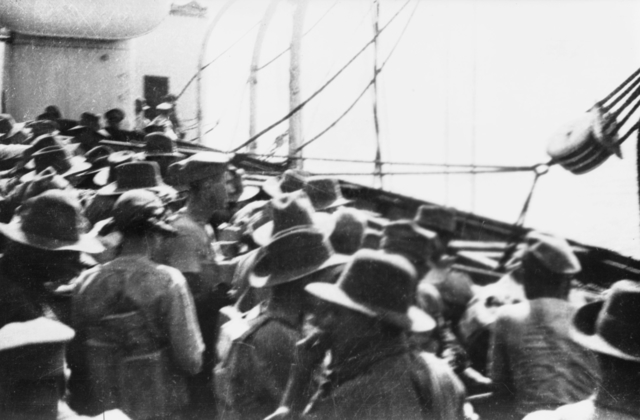
- Troops from the 21st Battalion prepare to abandon the Southland after it was torpedoed by a German submarine, September 1915
- Active: 1915–1918; 1921–1929
- Country: Australia
- Branch: Australian Army
- Type: Infantry
- Size: ~1,000 men (Note: During World War I, the authorised strength of an Australian infantry battalion was 1,023 men.)
- Part of: 6th Brigade, 2nd Division (1915–18); 6th Brigade, 4th Division (1921–29)
- Colours: Black over red
- Engagements: World War I

Insignia
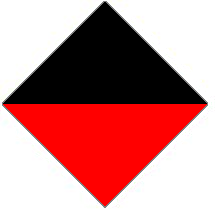
- Unit colour patch

The 21st Battalion was an infantry battalion of the Australian Army. It was raised in 1915 as part of the First Australian Imperial Force for service during World War I and formed part of the 6th Brigade, attached to the 2nd Division. It fought during the Gallipoli campaign and on the Western Front before being disbanded in late 1918. The battalion was the first Australian battalion to commence active operations on the Western Front and also had the distinction of being the last to pull back when the Australian Corps was withdrawn from the line. In 1921, the battalion was re-raised as a part-time unit of the Citizens Force but was later amalgamated with the 23rd Battalion in 1929 to form the 23rd/21st Battalion.

== History ==
=== World War I ===
The 21st Battalion was raised at Broadmeadows, Victoria, in February 1915 as part of the formation of the 6th Brigade, 2nd Division. A unit of the First Australian Imperial Force (AIF), it was raised from volunteers for overseas service that were drawn from all over Australia. After training at Broadmeadows and Seymour Camps in Victoria, the battalion left for Egypt. Arriving there in June 1915, it undertook further training before being dispatched as reinforcements to Gallipoli in late August. En route the battalion's transport, HMT Southland, was torpedoed by German submarine UB-14 near Lemnos and the passengers and crew were forced to abandon ship. Nevertheless, the 21st Battalion eventually arrived at ANZAC Cove on 7 September. Following this they undertook mainly defensive duties along the Australian line until December 1915, when they were evacuated from Gallipoli after the decision was made to withdraw Allied forces from the peninsula. One 21st Battalion soldier who was killed during the Gallipoli campaign, Private James Martin, who was only 14 years and nine months old, is believed to have been the youngest Australian soldier killed during the war.

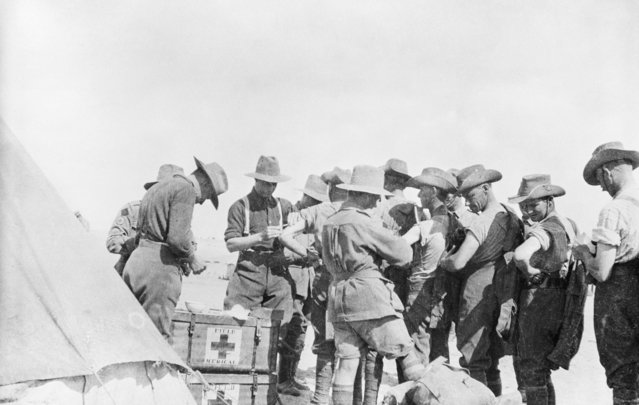
Members of the 21st Battalion receiving inoculations prior to deployment to Gallipoli

Returning to Egypt via Lemnos, the battalion undertook Canal Zone defensive duties and further training. During this time the AIF underwent a period of reorganisation while its future employment on operations was decided. A number of units from the 1st Division were split up and used to provide cadre staff for newly formed battalions, however, the 21st Battalion, like the rest of those from the 2nd Division remained intact. In mid-1916, the decision was made to transfer part of the AIF to Europe to take part in the fighting along the Western Front, and in March 1916 the battalion arrived in France. In April, they became the first Australian battalion to "commence active operations on the Western Front". In July 1916, during the Battle of Pozières, the battalion was committed to the battle, but was mainly used to carry out portage tasks. Later, in August, during the fighting around Mouquet Farm, the 21st Battalion suffered its most significant losses of the war.

Throughout 1917, the battalion took part in two major battles after the Germans shortened their lines and withdrew towards the prepared defences of the Hindenburg Line. The first battle came in May, when the 21st Battalion fought in the Second Battle of Bullecourt. Later, they were moved to Belgium, where in October, during the fighting around Broodseinde they advanced over 3 kilometres (3,000 m) before being withdrawn from the line for rest.

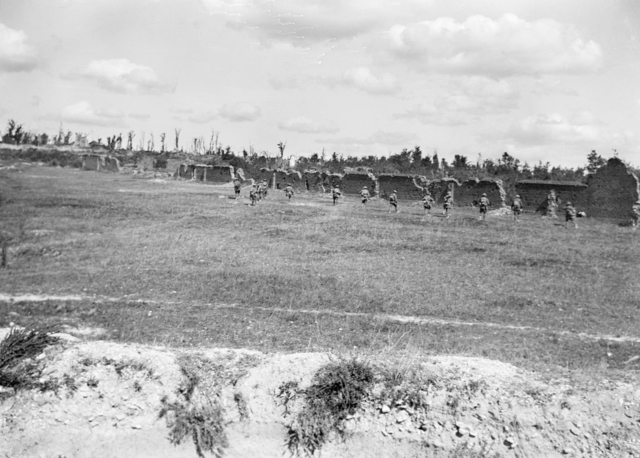
The 21st Battalion attacks Mont St Quentin, 1 September 1918

After a period in reserve for rest and reinforcement the battalion was called upon to help to defend against the German spring offensive of April 1918. After this was defeated, the Allies launched their own offensive, known as the Hundred Days Offensive and subsequently the 21st Battalion went on to participate in the battles of Hamel, Amiens and Mont St. Quentin. During the fight for Mont St Quentin, Sergeant Albert Lowerson was awarded the Victoria Cross. He had led seven men, attacking the flanks of a post, rushed the strongpoint and captured it, together with 12 machine-guns and 30 prisoners. He was severely wounded in the right thigh, but refused to leave the front line until the position had been consolidated.

As a result of the heavy losses that the battalion suffered during this time, coupled with the limited reinforcements arriving from Australia following the defeat of the conscription referendum, the 21st Battalion's strength fell to the point where it was able to field little more than a company of men fit for active service. As a result, it was ordered to disband and provide reinforcements to other battalions. On 25 September 1918, however, the battalion's personnel mutinied in protest against the order to disband and subsequently the order was rescinded. Thus, the 21st Battalion took part in the final Australian operation of the war, joining the attack at Montbrehain on 5 October. The following day, however, upon a request made by Prime Minister Billy Hughes, the Australian Corps was withdrawn from the line. The 21st Battalion had the distinction of being the last Australian battalion to be withdrawn.

Following this, the battalion was formally disbanded on 13 October 1918 and its personnel dispersed to other units as reinforcements. Throughout its service during the war, it suffered 872 men killed and 2,434 wounded (including those that were gassed). Members of the battalion received the following decorations: one Victoria Cross, five Distinguished Service Orders with one Bar, one Officer of the Order of the British Empire, 22 Military Crosses with seven Bars, 29 Distinguished Conduct Medals, 117 Military Medals with seven Bars, seven Meritorious Service Medals, 24 Mentions in Despatches, and eight foreign awards.

An official history of the battalion during the war, The Story of the Twenty-First, was compiled by Captain Alexander Rowan Macneil and published by the 21st Battalion Association in 1920.

=== Inter-war years ===
In May 1921, following the decision to reorganise Australia's part-time military force to reflect the formations of the AIF, the battalion was re-raised as a Citizens Force unit drawing personnel drawn from currently serving Citizen Forces soldiers and ex-AIF members. Headquartered around Warrnambool, Victoria, the battalion was assigned to the 6th Brigade once again, but that brigade was allocated to 4th Division, within the 3rd Military District. Upon formation, the newly raised unit drew personnel from parts of the 21st and 23rd Infantry Regiments, and the 19th Light Horse. Through these links, it perpetuated the battle honours and traditions of its predecessor units, including an honour for service in South Africa. In 1927, when territorial designations were adopted, the battalion assumed the title of "The Victorian Rangers"; its motto – Pro Deo Et Patria – was also approved that year.

Initially, the battalion was brought up to strength with personnel serving under the compulsory training scheme, but in 1929, following the election of the Scullin Labor government, the compulsory training scheme was abolished and this, coupled with the economic privations of the Great Depression reduced the number of recruits available. As a result, the decision was made to amalgamate a number of units. The 21st Battalion was one of those chosen and it was linked with the 23rd Battalion to become the 23rd/21st Battalion, which was headquartered around Geelong. This battalion undertook garrison duties in the Northern Territory during World War II, before being disbanded in August 1943 without having served overseas.

== Commanding officers ==
The following officers served as commanding officer of the 21st Battalion during World War I:

- Lieutenant Colonel John Francis Hutchinson;
- Lieutenant Colonel Frederick William Dempster Forbes;
- Lieutenant Colonel Bernard Oscar Charles Duggan.

== Battle honours ==
The 21st Battalion received the following battle honours for its service:

- Boer War: South Africa 1899–1902 (inherited);
- World War I: Suvla, Gallipoli 1915–16, Egypt 1915–16, Somme 1916–18, Pozières, Bapaume 1917, Bullecourt, Ypres 1917, Menin Road, Polygon Wood, Broodseinde, Poelcappelle, Passchendaele, Hamel, Amiens, Albert 1918, Mont St Quentin, Hindenburg Line, Beaurevoir, France and Flanders 1916–18. (Note: These honours are currently maintained by the 8th/7th Battalion, Royal Victoria Regiment.)
- World War II: South West Pacific 1942, Ambon, Laha (inherited). (Note: Entrusted to the 21st Battalion in 1961, and held on behalf of the 2/21st Battalion.)

== Notes ==
Footnotes

Citations
