= 23rd Battalion (Australia) =

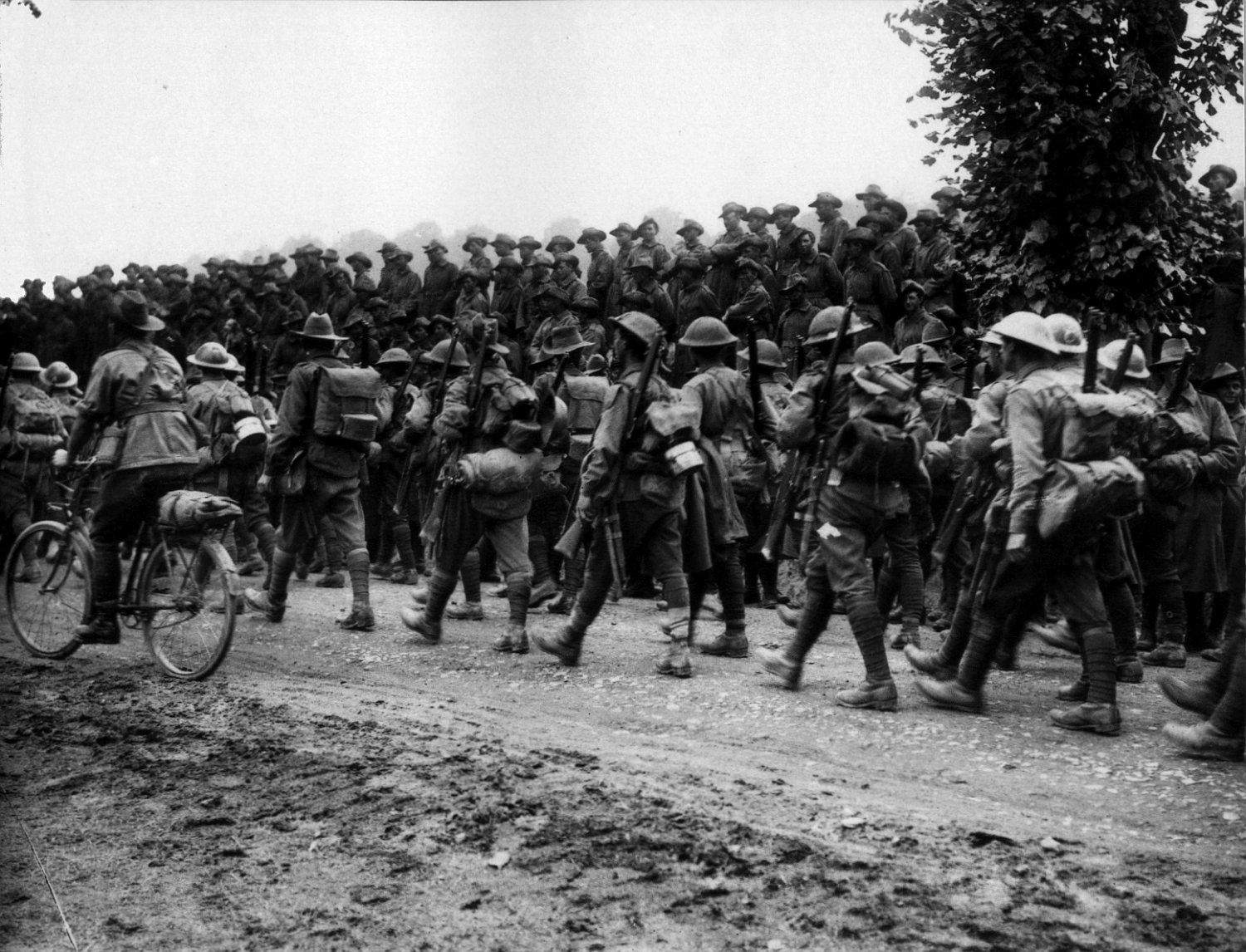
- Soldiers from the 6th Brigade, of which the 23rd Battalion was a part, at Warloy, August 1916
- Active: 1915–1919; 1921–1929
- Country: Australia
- Branch: Australian Army
- Type: Infantry
- Size: ~1,000 men
- Part of: 6th Brigade, 2nd Division
- Colours: Brown over red
- Engagements: World War I: Gallipoli campaign; Western Front

Insignia
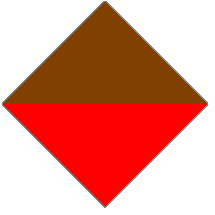
- Unit colour patch

The 23rd Battalion was an infantry battalion of the Australian Army. It was raised in 1915 as part of the Australian Imperial Force for service during World War I and formed part of the 6th Brigade, attached to the 2nd Division. After being formed in Australia, the battalion was sent to Egypt to complete its training, before being committed to the Gallipoli Campaign as reinforcements in September 1915. They remained on the peninsula until the evacuation of Allied troops in December, when they were withdrawn back to Egypt where they were reorganised before being transferred to the Western Front in March 1916. Over the course of the next two-and-a-half years, the 23rd took part in a number of significant battles in France and Belgium, before being disbanded in mid-1919 following the conclusion of hostilities. In 1921, the battalion was re-raised as a part-time unit within the Citizens Forces in the state of Victoria, but was amalgamated with the 21st Battalion in 1929 to form the 23rd/21st Battalion.

== History ==
=== World War I ===
==== Formation ====
The 23rd Battalion was raised in Victoria in March 1915 as part of the formation of the 2nd Division of the Australian Imperial Force (AIF). Its first commanding officer was Lieutenant Colonel George Morton. Together with the 21st, 22nd and 24th Battalions, it formed the 6th Brigade under the command of Colonel Richard Linton. Organised into four rifle companies, designated 'A' through to 'D', with a machine gun section in support, the Australian infantry battalion of the time had an authorised strength of 1,023 men of all ranks. After completing initial training at Broadmeadows, in May 1915 the 23rd embarked upon the troopship Euripides bound for Egypt. They arrived in Alexandria on 11 June and after being moved by train to Cairo they marched to a camp at Heliopolis where they undertook further training in preparation for deployment to Gallipoli, where the units of the 1st Division had landed on 25 April 1915.

==== Gallipoli ====
While they were training, the Allies launched the August Offensive in an attempt to break the deadlock that had developed on the Gallipoli Peninsula following the initial landing. The offensive largely failed and heavy casualties resulted. In order to replace the men that were lost and give the survivors a rest, the decision was made by Allied commanders to move the 2nd Division from Egypt. After being moved to Lemnos Island, the 23rd Battalion embarked for Gallipoli on 4 September, arriving there at 9:30 pm that evening. A day of familiarisation followed before the battalion took up defensive positions at Lone Pine. On 12 September, the 23rd, along with their sister battalion, the 24th, took over responsibility for the post from the 1st Division battalions that had held it previously. During the stalemate that followed, manning positions that, in some places, were only a few metres from the Ottoman lines, the 23rd Battalion began countermining operations after Turkish mining operations were discovered. For the next three months, due to the intensity of the fighting in the sector, the battalion alternated their position with the 24th Battalion almost every day until the evacuation of Allied troops from the peninsula occurred, embarking with the last troops to leave on the night of 19/20 December 1915.

Following their withdrawal from Gallipoli, the 23rd Battalion was moved to Lemnos Island, where they remained until January 1916 when they were transferred back to Egypt. At this time, the AIF was reorganised and expanded in preparation for future operations. Two new infantry divisions were formed from the experienced troops of the 1st Division who had deployed to Gallipoli at the start of the campaign, while a third division was raised in Australia from scratch. The 2nd Division was largely left untouched, so that it could complete its formation which had been interrupted by its deployment to Gallipoli. The 23rd subsequently spent the early months of 1916 rebuilding its strength and conducting further training in preparation for its transfer to Europe.

==== Western Front ====
After arriving in France in March, the battalion moved to the Western Front, occupying the forward positions around Armentières in northern France on 10 April 1916. In mid-July, the battalion was transferred to the Somme, where they subsequently took part in the Battles of Pozières and Mouquet Farm, during which they suffered almost 90 per cent casualties. In early 1917, the Germans shortened their lines and withdrew to the Hindenburg Line and the Australian divisions in the Somme were ordered to carry out an advance to follow them up. After being reinforced, the 23rd Battalion was committed to the fighting at the Second Battle of Bullecourt in early May 1917 after the first attempt to capture the town by the 4th Australian Division failed. Succeeding in capturing all its objectives, it was heavily counter-attacked by German forces, suffering a large number of casualties, including 100 men killed or died of wounds before being relieved by the Australian 3rd Battalion. After this the battalion was withdrawn from the line until early September 1917 when they moved into positions around Ypres, Belgium, and participated in the Battle of Broodseinde on 4 October. During this battle, the 6th Brigade was positioned to the south of Zonnebeke Lake, and the 23rd Battalion lost three officers and 101 other ranks killed or wounded, some of which were inflicted when an intense German mortar barrage fell upon their "waiting line" prior to the attack. Nevertheless, the attack which followed, after overcoming an encounter with a German regiment, the 212th, in no man's land, resulted in success as the Australians captured the ridge.

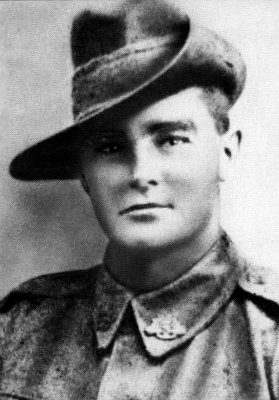
Robert MacTier, c. 1918

In early 1918, Russian resistance on the Eastern Front collapsed in the wake of the October Revolution and, as a result, the Germans were able to transfer a large number of troops to the Western Front. (Note: At 30 November 1917, there were 160 German divisions on the Western Front. Following the Treaty of Brest-Litovsk, this rose to 208.) This greatly improved the German strength in the west and, as a result, in March, they launched their Spring Offensive. With the Germans making rapid gains, many Australian units, including the 23rd Battalion, were thrown into the line to blunt the attack in early April, as the 6th Brigade relieved the 12th around Dernancourt. After the German offensive was halted, a brief lull followed during which the Allies sought to regain the initiative, launching a series of "Peaceful Penetration" operations. Following this, the 23rd participated in the fighting at Hamel on 4 July, advancing as the right-hand battalion on the southern front behind a devastatingly accurate preparatory barrage. On 8 August 1918, the 23rd joined the Allied Hundred Days Offensive, which was launched at Amiens, and was followed by a series of advances followed as the Allies began advancing through the Somme. For his actions during the fighting at Mont St. Quentin in early September, one of the battalion's soldiers, Private Robert Mactier, was awarded the Victoria Cross posthumously. After participating in the Battle of Montbrehain between 3 and 5 October, the battalion was sent to the rear for rest when the units of the Australian Corps, severely depleted, were withdrawn from the line upon the insistence of the Australian prime minister, Billy Hughes. As a result, it took no further part in the fighting before the armistice was declared on 11 November.

Following the end of hostilities, the demobilisation process began and slowly the battalion's numbers began to dwindle as its personnel were repatriated back to Australia and returned to civilian life. The 23rd Battalion was disbanded in Belgium on 30 April 1919. Throughout its service during the war, it suffered 686 killed and 2,317 wounded (including gassed). For its involvement during the war, the 23rd Battalion received a total of 19 battle honours; these were bestowed upon the battalion in 1927.

=== Re-raising and subsequent amalgamation ===
In 1921, the decision was made to perpetuate the battle honours and traditions of the AIF by re-organising the units of the Citizens Forces to adopt the numerical designations of the AIF units with which they were affiliated. As a result of this decision, the 23rd Battalion was re-raised in Victoria, drawing personnel from the 2nd and 5th Battalions, 23rd Infantry Regiment, and part of the 29th Light Horse Regiment, and perpetuating the battle honours of its AIF predecessor. It later adopted the title of the "23rd Battalion (The City of Geelong Regiment)" when territorial titles were introduced in 1927. At the same time it was granted the motto Nulli Secundus. In 1928, the battalion was part of the 2nd Brigade, within the 3rd Military District.

Initially, the Citizen Forces units were maintained through a mixture of voluntary and compulsory service, but in late 1929, following the election of the Scullin Labor government, the compulsory training scheme was abolished and this, coupled with the economic privations of the Great Depression drastically reduced the number of recruits available. As a result, the decision was made to amalgamate a number of units. The 23rd Battalion was one of those chosen and it was linked with the 21st Battalion to become the 23rd/21st Battalion, adopting the territorial designation of "The City of Geelong Regiment/The Victoria Rangers". This battalion undertook garrison duties in the Northern Territory during World War II, before being disbanded in August 1943 as being surplus to Army requirements without having served overseas. After the war, following the demobilisation of the wartime Army, Australia's part-time military was re-formed in 1948, but the 23rd Battalion was not re-raised at the time. In 1961, although the battalion was in a state of suspended animation, it was entrusted with the 13 battle honours awarded to the 2/23rd Battalion for its service in North Africa and New Guinea during World War II.

== Commanding officers ==
During World War I, the following officers served as commanding officer of the 23rd Battalion:

- George Frederick Morton;
- George Hodges Knox;
- Wilfred Kent Fethers;
- William Brazenor;
- William Joseph Bateman.

== Battle honours ==
The 23rd Battalion was awarded the following battle honours:

- World War I: Gallipoli 1915, Egypt 1915–16, Somme 1916–18, Pozières, Bapaume 1917, Bullecourt, Ypres 1917, Menin Road, Polygon Wood, Broodseinde, Poelcappelle, Passchendaele, Hamel, Amiens, Albert 1918, Mont St Quentin, Hindenburg Line, Beaurevoir, France and Flanders 1916–18.
- World War II: North Africa 1941–42, Defence of Tobruk, The Salient 1941, Defence of Alamein Line, El Alamein, South-West Pacific 1943–45, Lae–Nadzab, Finschhafen, Borneo, Busu River, Sattelberg, Wareo and Tarakan (inherited).

== Notes ==
Footnotes

Citations
