= 6th Brigade (Australia) =

Unit of the Australian Army

6th Combat Support Brigade
- Active: 1912–1996; 2010–2024
- Country: Australia
- Branch: Australian Army
- Type: Infantry (1915–96); Command support and intelligence, surveillance, target acquisition and reconnaissance (2010–2024)
- Size: 3,500 (active)
- Part of: 2nd Division (1915–20 & 1991–96); 4th Division (1920–44); 5th Division (1944–45); 3rd Division (1948–91); Forces Command (2010–2024)
- Engagements: First World War; Gallipoli campaign; Western Front; Second World War; New Guinea campaign; New Britain campaign; 2021 Solomon Islands unrest

Insignia
- Unit colour patch

The 6th Combat Support Brigade was an Australian Army brigade. First formed in 1912 as a Militia formation to provide training under the compulsory training scheme, the brigade was re-raised during the First World War as an infantry unit of the all volunteer Australian Imperial Force. It subsequently served at Gallipoli and in France and Belgium on the Western Front. In the 1920s, as part of a reorganisation of the Australian Army, it became part of the 3rd Military District of the Citizens Military Force, encompassing units from Victoria and South Australia. In 1991, it became part of the Ready Reserve Scheme, based at Enoggera Barracks, in Brisbane, Queensland, before being disbanded in 1996 when the scheme was discontinued. The brigade was re-raised on 1 March 2010 to oversee the Army's command support and intelligence, surveillance, target acquisition and reconnaissance (CS & ISTAR) units. It was disbanded on 13 December 2024 as part of changes to the structure of the Army.

== History ==
The 6th Brigade traces its origins to 1912, when it was formed as a Militia brigade as part of the introduction of the compulsory training scheme, assigned to the 2nd Military District. At this time, the brigade's constituent units had training depots located around New South Wales including Woollahra, Double Bay, Bondi, Randwick, Waterloo, North Botany, Rushcutters Bay, and Paddington.

=== First World War ===
Following the outbreak of World War I, the 6th Brigade was re-formed in early 1915 from volunteers for oversea service. At this time, the brigade consisted of four infantry battalions—the 21st, 22nd, 23rd and 24th Battalion—all of which were raised in Victoria. After being sent to Egypt in June 1915 with the 2nd Division as part of an expansion of the Australian Imperial Force, the brigade was sent to Gallipoli in September, however, as the last Allied offensive had come to an end the previous month, from then up until December 1915 when the Anzacs were evacuated from the peninsula, the brigade was not involved in any significant engagements. Later, in 1916, they were transferred to the Western Front, where they took part in the fighting in the trenches until 5 October 1918.

During their time on the Western Front, the 6th Brigade was involved in a number of major battles including the Battle of Pozières, the Battle of Mouquet Farm, and the Battle of Bullecourt. In 1917, the brigade took part in the Battle of Broodseinde. They were also involved in beating back the tide of the German spring offensive in 1918 before taking part in the final campaign of the war as part of the Hundred Days Offensive.

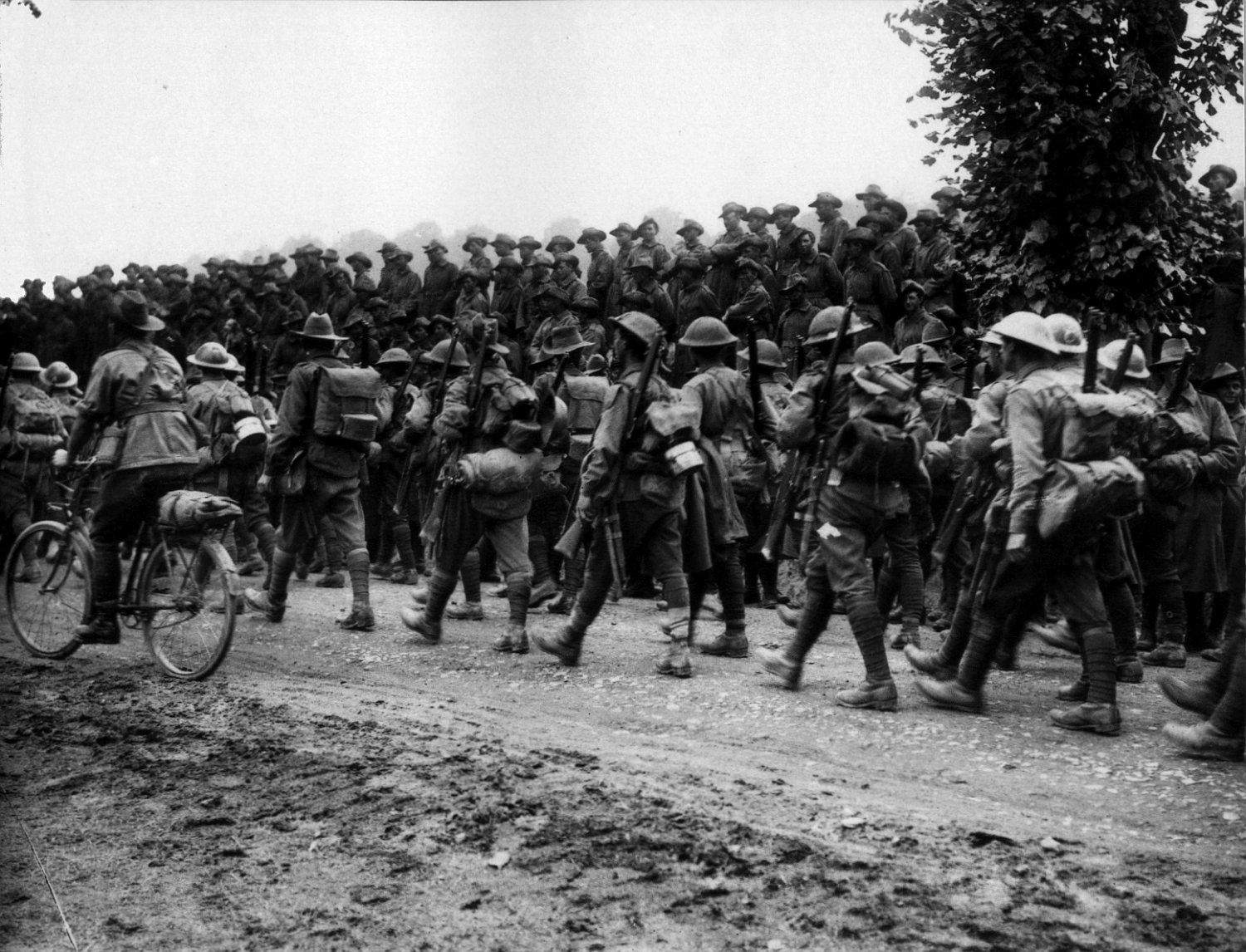
Australian soldiers from the 6th Brigade marching in the Battle of the Somme

=== Inter war years and Second World War ===
In 1920, following the re-organisation of the Citizens Military Force (CMF), the 6th Brigade became part of the 4th Infantry Division, encompassing units drawn from Victoria and South Australia. It was headquartered in Melbourne at this time. In 1928, it became part of the 3rd Military District and was re-organised to include the 7th, 8th, 21st and 38th Battalions.

At the start of the Second World War, the brigade was mobilised for full time service in December 1941, after Japan's entry into the war. The brigade consisted of the 7th, 8th and 38th Battalions at this time and concentrated at Balcombe, Victoria at this time, although it moved to Dandenong shortly afterwards. Assuming a command reserve role in the defence of Melbourne, the brigade was bolstered with the 17th Light Horse (Machine Gun) Regiment and the 4th Armoured Regiment. In early 1942, the 7th and 8th Battalions were detached to Darwin, Northern Territory, and the brigade was moved to Gherang to form part of the Army Headquarters Reserve; the 17th Light Horse and 4th Armoured Regiments were detached at this time, and the 48th Battalion was gained from South Australia.

In March 1942, the 6th Brigade was dispatched to undertake garrison duties in Western Australia, at which time the 48th Battalion was replaced by the 14th Battalion. They remained there until January 1943, when the brigade returned to Seymour, Victoria, for a period of leave prior to deployment to the Northern Territory to replace the 3rd Brigade. The plans to send the brigade to Darwin were cancelled, though, and instead it moved to Woodford, Queensland. In July 1943, consisting of the 14th/32nd, 19th and 36th Battalions, it was sent to New Guinea. Based in Buna, in Papua, they carried out garrison duties as well as patrols around the areas surrounding Milne and Nassu Bay. In May 1944, they moved to Lae. In June they were sent to Buolo for a rest, before returning to Lae in September where they were transferred from the 4th Division to the 5th Division and the decision was made to send them to New Britain.

In November 1944, the 14th/32nd Battalion and other elements of the brigade landed at Jacquinot Bay, where the 5th Division's main logistics base was to be constructed. After the other two battalions arrived the brigade began a campaign of harassment against the much larger Japanese forces on the island, with the objective of restricting Japanese freedom of action in the area. The brigade advanced along the coast, using barges, crossing the Mevelo River in February before carrying out a number of patrols towards the Wulwut River to the east. In mid-March, they came up against the main Japanese defensive line in the Waitavalo–Tol Plantation around Bacon Hill and over the course of two days, the 19th Battalion and 14th/32nd fought to capture it.

Following this, the 6th Brigade established a defensive line that extended across the Gazelle Peninsula, and from there they continued to mount patrols into Japanese held-territory until April 1945 when they were withdrawn back to Australia. Although it was originally planned that the brigade would re-organise to make up its losses and begin training for participation in further operations, as the war in the Pacific wound down, the decision was made disbanded the 6th Brigade and a number of its component units in July 1945 as part of the demobilisation process. This took place at Strathpine, Queensland.

=== Post war ===
In 1948, the CMF was re-raised and the 6th Brigade, under the command of Brigadier Selwyn Porter, was allocated to 3rd Division along with the 4th and 9th Brigades. By April 1953, it was part of Southern Command. In the immediate period, the 6th Brigade consisted of the 38th, 58th/32nd and 12th/40th Battalions.

Between 1960 and 1965, the Australian Army briefly adopted the Pentropic divisional structure. During this time brigade formations were discontinued, although their headquarters units remained in many cases, to improve the flow of information. Following the decision to return to the traditional triangular divisional structure in 1965, the brigade formations were re-adopted, albeit with the designation of task forces rather than brigades, as it was felt that the later term was too "rigid". As a result, the 6th Brigade was known for a time as the 6th Task Force. In early 1982, however, the designation of brigade was readopted.

The Ready Reserve Scheme was established in 1991 and the brigade was re-organised around this scheme, forming a combined arms element based in Queensland consisting of roughly 3,719 personnel incorporating the 6th Battalion, Royal Australian Regiment, 8th/9th Battalion, Royal Australian Regiment, 49th Battalion, Royal Queensland Regiment, 'A' Squadron, 4th Cavalry Regiment, 139th Signals Regiment, 1st Field Regiment and the 6th Brigade Administrative Support Battalion. At this time, the 3rd Division was disbanded and the 6th Brigade was re-allocated to the 2nd Division. Later, in 1996, after the decision was made to discontinue the Ready Reserve Scheme, the 6th Brigade was disbanded, and its units were merged with others and reallocated to the 7th Brigade.

=== CS & ISTAR brigade ===
The 6th Brigade was re-raised on 1 March 2010 to command the Army's CS & ISTAR units. Its headquarters is located at Victoria Barracks, Sydney and it forms part of the Army's Forces Command. For a period, the brigade commanded the Army's Regional Force Surveillance Units, but these were later reorganized as direct command units under 2nd Division headquarters. On 2 October 2018, the 1st Military Police Battalion transitioned from the 17th Brigade to align it with other theatre-level combat support capabilities that were already under the command of the 6th Brigade.

The 20th Regiment, Royal Australian Artillery was transferred from the 6th Brigade to the 16th Aviation Brigade in 2022.

As of 2023 the 6th Brigade consisted of:

- Headquarters, 6th Brigade (Victoria Barracks, NSW)
- 1st Intelligence Battalion (Victoria Barracks, NSW)
- 1st Military Police Battalion (HQ at Gallipoli Barracks, Enoggera, QLD)
- 6th Engineer Support Regiment (RAAF Base Amberley, Qld)
- 7th Signal Regiment (Borneo Barracks, Qld)
- 12th Chief Engineer Works (Gallipoli Barracks, Qld)
- 16th Regiment, Royal Australian Artillery (Woodside Barracks, SA)
- 19th Chief Engineer Works (Randwick Barracks, NSW)
- 20th Regiment, Royal Australian Artillery (Gallipoli Barracks, Qld)

As part of changes to the structure of the Army, the 6th Brigade's units were transferred to other headquarters starting in December 2024. The brigade was disbanded on 13 December 2024.
