= Battle of Mont Saint-Quentin =

1918 battle on the Western Front of World War I

- Part of the Western Front of World War I Hundred Days Offensive : Second Battle of the Somme (1918)
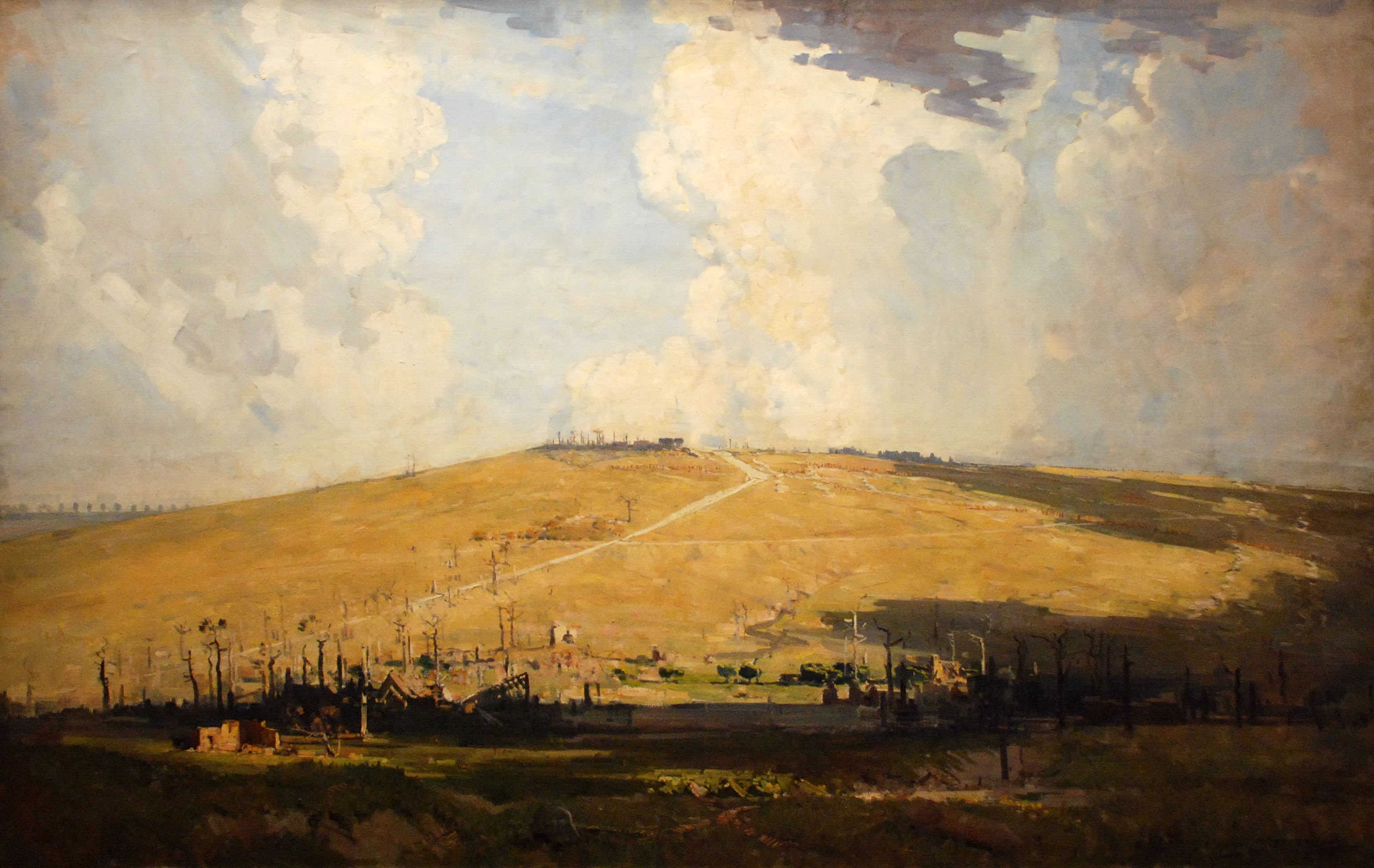
- Mount St Quentin painting by Arthur Streeton (1918)
Date	31 August – 3 September 1918
Location	Mont Saint-Quentin, near Péronne; Picardy, France 49.9472°N 2.9325°E
Result	Australian Corps victory

Belligerents
Australia	German Empire

Commanders and leaders
(Australia) John Monash	(German Empire) Max von Boehn

Casualties and losses
3,000 casualties	2,600 captured

The Battle of Mont Saint-Quentin was a battle on the Western Front during World War I. As part of the Allied Hundred Days Offensive on the Western Front in the late summer of 1918, the Australian Corps crossed the Somme River on the night of 31 August and broke the German lines at Mont Saint-Quentin and Péronne. The British Fourth Army's commander, General Henry Rawlinson, described the Australian advances of 31 August – 4 September as the greatest military achievement of the war. During the battle Australian troops stormed, seized and held the key height of Mont Saint-Quentin (overlooking Péronne), a pivotal German defensive position on the line of the Somme.

== Background ==
The Allies were pursuing the Germans, and the greatest obstacle to crossing the Somme River in pursuit was Mont Saint-Quentin which dominated the whole position. The Mont was only 100 metres high but was a key to the German defence of the Somme line, and the last German stronghold. It overlooked the Somme River approximately 1.5 kilometres north of Péronne. Its location made it an ideal observation post, and strategically, the hill's defences guarded the north and western approaches to the town.

Australian forces faced the German LI Corps, part of 2nd Army, under General Max von Boehn. According to Australian official historian Charles Bean, "German archives show that the 51st Corps anticipated the offensive... The line divisions were ordered to increase their depth and the counter-attack divisions to 'stand to.'" Bean states that LI Corps controlled the 5th Royal Bavarian Division, 1st Reserve Division and 119th Division. The German 94th Infantry Regiment (part of the IV Reserve Corps) was also involved in the battle.

== Battle ==
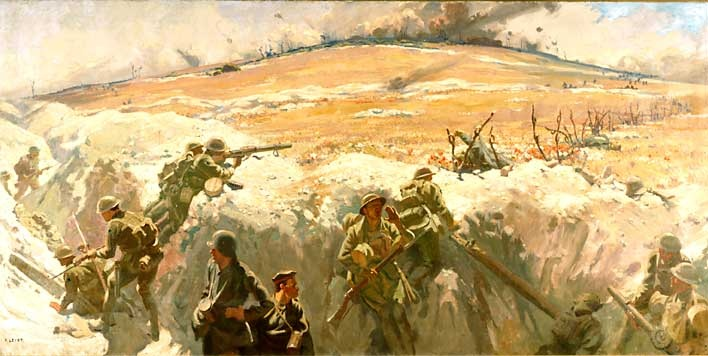
Capture of Mont Saint Quentin painting by Fred Leist (1920)

The offensive was planned by General John Monash; Monash planned a high-risk frontal assault which required the Australian 2nd Division to cross a series of marshes to attack the heights. This plan failed when the assaulting troops could not cross the marshes. After this initial setback, Monash manoeuvred his divisions in the only free manoeuvre battle of any consequence undertaken by the Australians on the Western Front.

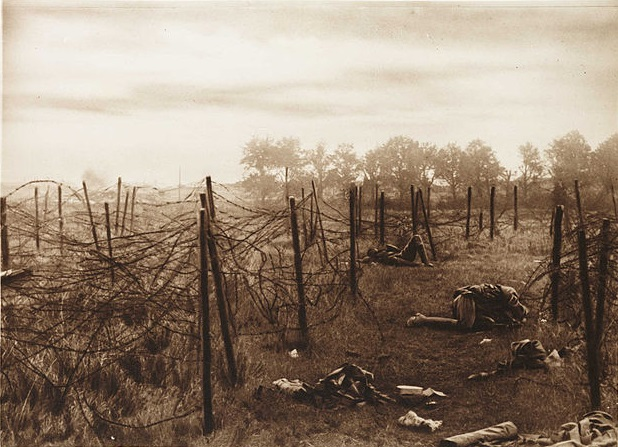
"The gaps in the wire near Anvil Wood were death traps", reads the caption of a contemporary photograph of the battlefield.

Australians of the 2nd Division crossed to the north bank of the Somme River on the evening of 30 August. At 5 am on 31 August, supported by artillery, two significantly undermanned Australian battalions charged up Mont St Quentin, ordered by Monash to "scream like bushrangers". The Germans quickly surrendered and the Australians continued to the main German trench-line. In the rear, other Australians crossed the Somme by a bridge which Australian engineers had saved and repaired. The Australians were unable to hold their gains on Mont St Quentin and German reserves regained the crest. However, the Australians held on just below the summit and next day it was recaptured and firmly held. On that day also, 1 September, Australian forces broke into Péronne and took most of the town. The next day it completely fell into Australian hands. In three days the Australians endured 3,000 casualties but ensured a general German withdrawal eastwards back to the Hindenburg Line.

== Aftermath ==
Looking back after the event, Monash accounted for the success by the wonderful gallantry of the men, the rapidity with which the plan was carried out, and the sheer daring of the attempt. In his Australian Victories in France, Monash pays tribute to the commander of the 2nd Division, Major-General Charles Rosenthal, who was in charge of the operation. But Monash and his staff were responsible for the conception of the project and the working out of the plans.

The Allied victory at the Battle of Mont Saint Quentin dealt a strong blow to five German divisions, including the elite 2nd Guards Division. As the position overlooked much of the terrain east of Mont St. Quentin, it guaranteed that the Germans would not be able to stop the allies west of the Hindenburg Line (the same position from which the Germans had launched their offensive in the spring). A total of 2,600 prisoners were taken at a cost of slightly over 3,000 casualties.

The following soldiers were awarded the Victoria Cross for their role in the battle, all to members of the Australian 2nd Division:

- Albert David Lowerson, 21st Battalion, originally from Myrtleford, Victoria
- Robert MacTier, 23rd Battalion, originally from Tatura, Victoria
- Edgar Thomas Towner, 2nd Machine Gun Battalion, from Blackall, Queensland
- Lawrence Carthage Weathers, 43rd Battalion (Australia), 3rd Division, was awarded the Victoria Cross for his role in the battle.

Other medals awarded included the Military Medal. Robert James Young, 25th Battalion, originally from Brisbane, was one such awardee. During the attack, according to Rosenthal, the recommending general, "he selected a position on a hill which was being heavily shelled at the time. He remained there for half an hour trying to establish visual communication. When this failed, he at once ran at a line to bde Forward Station through very heavy machine gun and artillery fire and remained out on the line the whole day, keeping it in order. Throughout the whole operation he showed an utter disregard of danger and set a fine example to all his men."

William Stevens, 23rd Australian Infantry Battalion, originally from Melbourne was awarded a Bar to his Military Medal for his work during the battle. In part, his citation from Rosenthal reads: "In the Village fighting he personal lead a party of five which accounted for 16 of the enemy who put up a spirited resistance. Later during the consolidation, he personally supervised the placing of the six Company Lewis Guns, moving around the Company front in spite of fierce enemy fire. His work throughout was of the highest order, and his fighting spirit throughout was of the greatest value to the success of his Company."

== See also ==
- Mont Saint-Quentin Australian war memorial
