= 20th Regiment, Royal Australian Artillery =

Australian Army unit

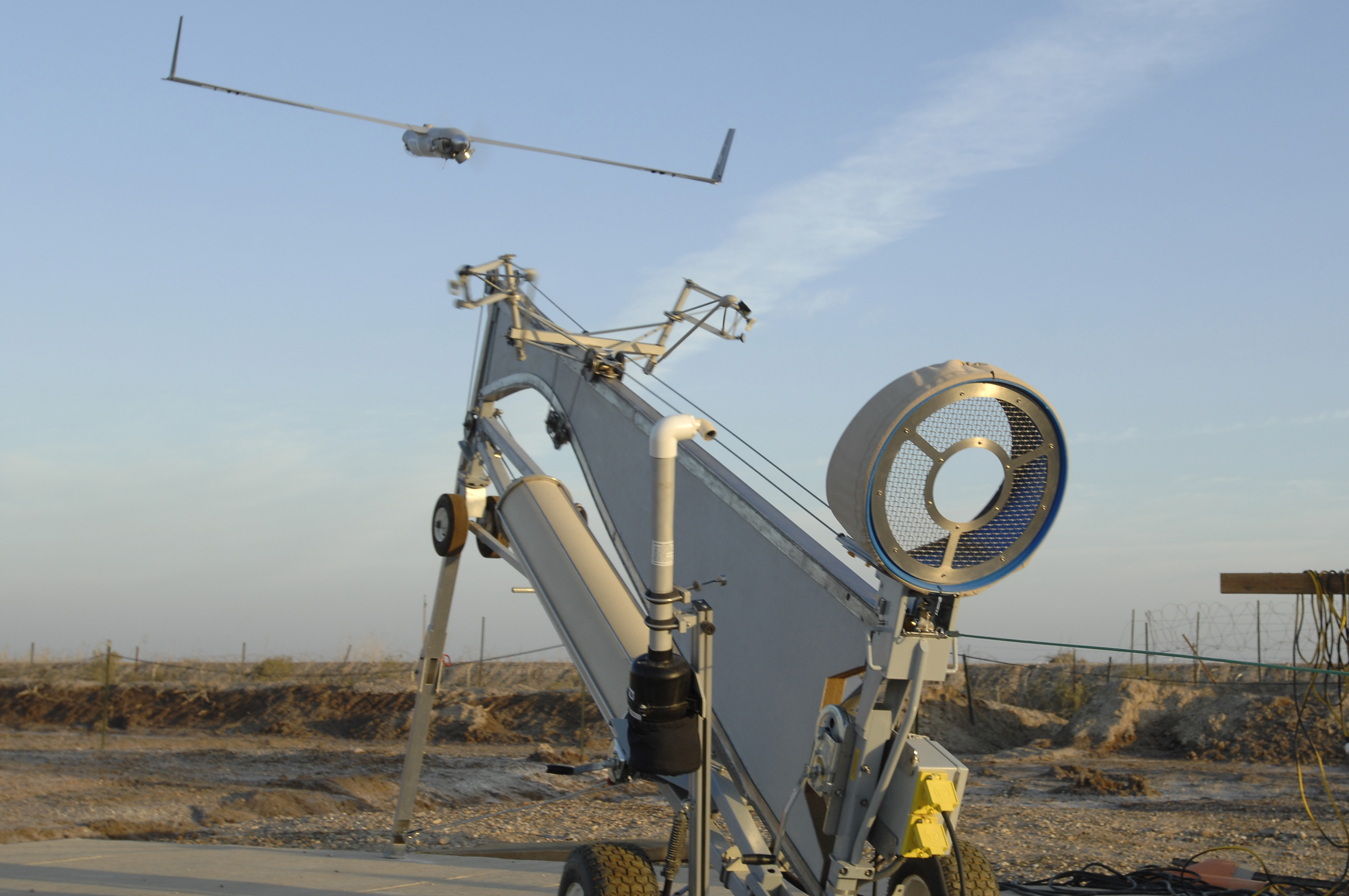
- A 20 STA Scan Eagle UAV being launched in Iraq during 2007
- Active: 2006–Present
- Country: Australia
- Branch: Australian Army
- Type: Surveillance and target acquisition
- Part of: 16th Aviation Brigade
- Garrison/HQ: Enoggera Barracks, Brisbane
- Motto: "Seek to Strike"
- Equipment: A61 Integrator Tactical Uncrewed Aerial System (TUAS)

Insignia
- Unit colour patch

The 20th Regiment, Royal Australian Artillery is an Australian Army regiment which was raised in 2006 as the 20th Surveillance and Target Acquisition Regiment.

Responsible for providing intelligence, surveillance, target acquisition and reconnaissance (ISTAR), the regiment has deployed personnel to operations in East Timor, the Solomon Islands, Iraq and Afghanistan, operating a variety of equipment.

== History ==
Consisting of three batteries – the 131st STA, 132nd UAV and CSS Bty – the regiment draws on the lineage of the 20th Locating Regiment, which was disbanded in 1971; the 131st Divisional Locating Battery served with the 1st Australian Task Force during the Vietnam War, having originally been formed in 1954 as a Citizens Military Force (CMF) unit before becoming a regular unit in 1965. The 131st was deployed to Vietnam between 1966 and 1971. The 132nd Locating Battery was also formed as part of the CMF around the same time.

The 131st STA Battery was transferred to the regiment in 2006, and while the remainder of the regiment began forming in 2007. The regiment is responsible for providing the Australian Army with intelligence, surveillance, target acquisition and reconnaissance as well as artillery spotting and target designation. The regiment is based at Gallipoli Barracks in Enoggera, Queensland.

All elements of the regiment were formed over the course of several years after 2007. The 132nd UAV Battery was to operate the Army's Israel Aircraft Industries I-View UAVs from 2010, but the acquisition of these UAVs was canceled in 2009. The regiment then operated Boeing ScanEagle UAVs, and deployed UAV detachments to Iraq and Afghanistan. The regiment has also deployed the AN/TPQ-36 Weapon Locating Radar to Iraq.

On 1 March 2010, 20STA became part of the re-raised 6th Brigade. After the cancellation of the I-View, in August 2010 the AAI Shadow 200 was approved for purchase, with the first systems expected to be operating in Australian hands by the end of 2011. After training in the US, the regiment deployed a battery to Afghanistan in 2012, eventually rotating three batteries through this deployment. The Shadow is due for replacement around 2022. Under Land 129 Phase 3, Boeing subsidiary Insitu Pacific was chosen to supply the Integrator Tactical Unmanned Aerial System (TUAS) with first deliveries expected in 2023.

As well as deployments to Afghanistan and Iraq, the regiment has also deployed personnel to East Timor and the Solomon Islands. In October 2019, the regiment was renamed the 20th Regiment, Royal Australian Artillery. It was transferred to the 16th Aviation Brigade during 2022.

In 2020 the regiment consistent of two operational batteries (the 131st and 132nd), a regimental headquarters and combat service and support and operations support batteries. At this time the 133rd Battery was scheduled to be formed in 2022. This battery was raised in 2025. As of mid-2025, the 131st, 132nd and 133rd batteries were focused on operating tactical uncrewed aircraft systems.

== Current organisation ==
In 2025 the regiment consisted of:

- Regimental Headquarters
- 131st Battery
- 132nd Battery
- 133rd Battery
- Combat Service and Support Battery
- Operational Support Battery
