= 23rd/21st Battalion (Australia) =

- Active: 1929–1943
- Country: Australia
- Allegiance: Australian Crown
- Branch: Australian Army
- Type: Infantry
- Size: Battalion

The 23rd/21st Battalion was an infantry battalion of the Australian Army. Part of the Citizen Military Force, it was formed in 1929 by the amalgamation of the 23rd and 21st Battalions due to lack of numbers in these two units. Upon formation they adopted the territorial title of the 23rd/21st Battalion (The City of Geelong Regiment/The Victoria Rangers). The end of the compulsory training scheme, which had been abolished by the newly elected Scullin Labor government, combined with the economic privations of the Great Depression had drastically reduced the number of recruits available. As a result, the decision was made to amalgamate a number of units.

During World War II, the unit carried out defensive duties in Victoria before being deployed to the Northern Territory in 1942, where it was assigned to the 19th Brigade, 6th Division. Due to manpower shortages in the Australian economy, it was disbanded on 28 August 1943 without having been deployed overseas.

== Alliances ==
- United Kingdom – Royal Scots Fusiliers
