= Mont Saint-Quentin =

Hill in Somme, France

Coordinates: 49°56′50″N 2°55′57″E

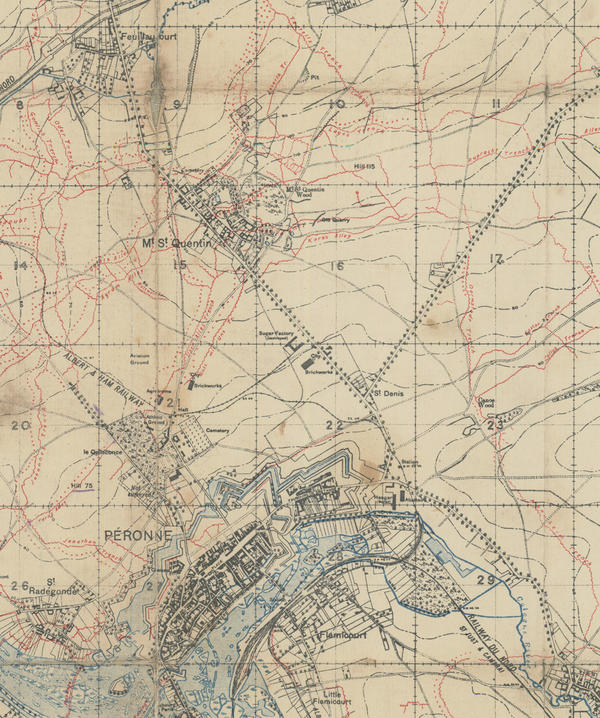
Extract of the British trench map of January 8, 1917

Mont Saint-Quentin overlooks the Somme River in the region of Picardie approximately 1.5 km north of the town of Péronne, Somme, France. The hill is about 100 metres high but as it is situated in a bend of the river it dominates the whole position and is of strategic significance. During World War I, it was a key to the German defence of the Somme line and was the last German stronghold. Its location made it an ideal observation point, and strategically, the hill's defences guarded the north and western approaches to the town of Péronne. It was the site of the Battle of Mont Saint-Quentin from 31 August to 2 September 1918.

== Australian war memorial ==
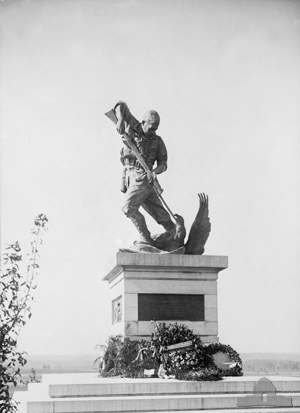
Sculpture by Web Gilbert on memorial from 1925 to 1940

The Australian Second Division has a war memorial on the road from Bapaume to Péronne. It is the only one of the five Australian division memorials initiated by members of the division. It was unveiled by Marshal Ferdinand Foch on the 30th of August 1925. The statue was demolished by German soldiers in 1940 and a more somber replacement by Stanley James Hammond unveiled in 1971.
