= Fighting for Mouquet Farm =

Engagement in the Battle of the Somme, 1916

- Part of the Battle of the Somme of the First World War
- Battle of the Somme, 1916
Date	23 July – 26 September 1916
Location	Near Pozières, France 50°03′04″N 02°42′46″E
Result	British victory

Belligerents
British Empire; Australia; Canada; United Kingdom	German Empire

Commanders and leaders
Douglas Haig; Hubert Gough	Fritz von Below; Max von Gallwitz

Casualties and losses
6,300	
- Mouquet Farm, south of the D 73 Pozières–Thiepval road, south of Grandcourt, south-west of Courcelette in the Somme department of northern France

The Fighting for Mouquet Farm (the Battle of Mouquet Farm) took place between the British Reserve Army and the German Army during the Battle of the Somme (1916). The fighting began on 23 July. The farm was captured by the 3rd Canadian Division of the Canadian Corps on 16 September, then lost to a German counter-attack, before being re-captured on 26 September by the 11th (Northern) Division during the Battle of Thiepval Ridge (26–28 September). Number 16 Section of the 6th Battalion East Yorkshire Regiment (Pioneers) smoked out the last German defenders.

== Background ==
=== 1916 ===
Mouquet Farm was to the right of the modern D 73 Pozières–Thiepval road, south of Grandcourt and to the south-west of Courcelette, about 1.1 mi (1.7 km) north-west of the high ground near Pozières. Following the fighting that had occurred around the village earlier in the year, a decision was made by the British to gain control of the ridge beyond the village to create a gap in the German lines, behind the salient that had developed around the German-held fortress of Thiepval. By capturing Mouquet Farm, the British hoped that it would destabilise the German position and enable subsequent gains.

== Battle ==
=== 10 August – 3 September ===
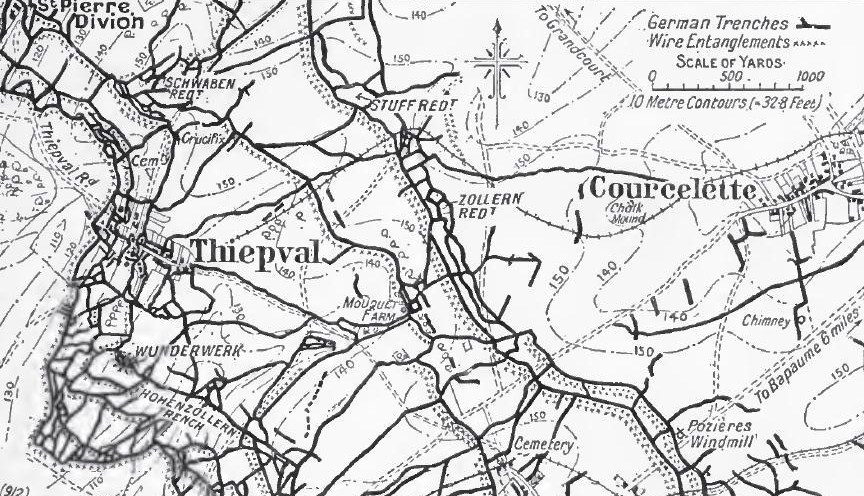
Map showing Mouquet Farm and the German defensive fortifications from Thiepval to Courcelette, July 1916

During the night of 10 August, parties of the 4th Australian Division of the I Anzac Corps, attacked towards the farm and managed to establish advanced posts in the valley south of the farm and to the east. Attacks were then made from a foothold in Fabeck Graben (Fabeck Trench) to the north-east and to deepen the salient near the farm. By 22 August, the 2nd Australian Division had made several more attempts on the farm and realised that the main defensive position was underground, where the Germans had excavated the cellars to create linked dug-outs. On 3 September, the 4th Australian Division attacked again with the 13th Brigade and captured much of the surface remains of the farm and trenches nearby, with hand-to-hand fighting in the ruins and underground. German counter-attacks repulsed the Australians except from a small part of Fabeck Graben, the fighting costing the Australians 2,049 casualties.

=== 16–26 September ===
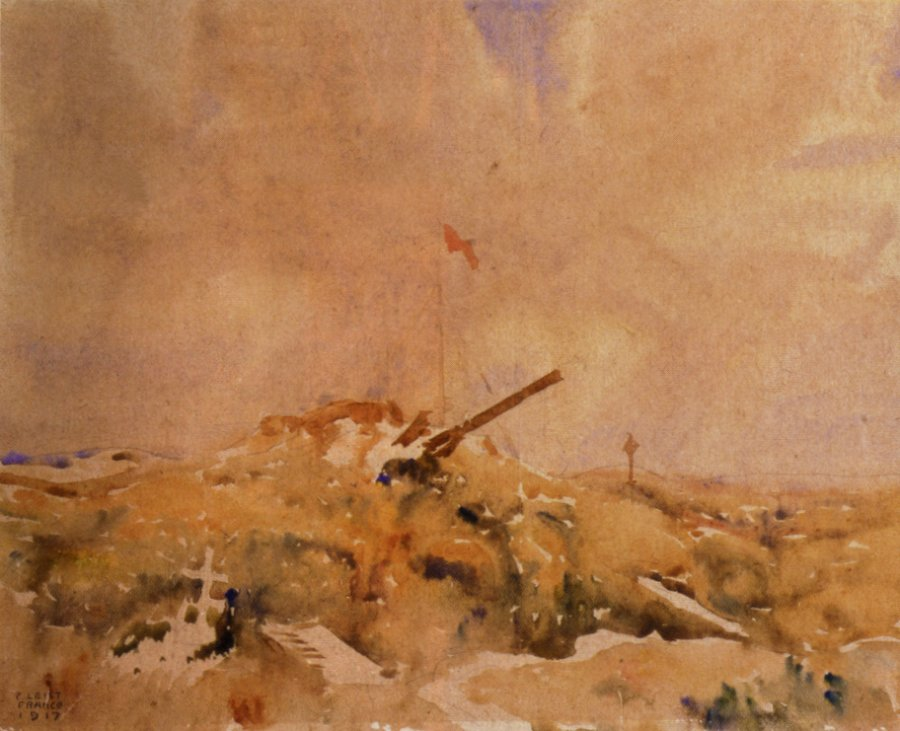
Mouquet farm, Pozières, by Fred Leist

During the battle, the divisions of I Anzac Corps advanced north-west along Pozières ridge, towards Mouquet Farm, with British divisions supporting on the left. The approaches to the farm were watched by German artillery observers, who directed artillery-fire on the attackers from three sides of the salient that had developed in the lines. Many casualties were caused to the attackers as they approached the farm; in August and into September, the Australians were repulsed three times.

The Canadian Corps relieved the I Anzac Corps on 5 September. The Canadians captured part of the farm on 16 September and were then repulsed by a counter-attack. By 25 September, further attacks had captured part of the farm on the surface but the Germans still held the cellars, dug-outs and tunnels beneath. The farm was captured on 26 September by the 34th Brigade of the 11th (Northern) Division, in the general attack of the Battle of Thiepval Ridge. The 9th Lancashire Fusiliers bombed the exits of the underground positions and also managed to reach the second objective, at the west end of Zollern Trench, where German machine-gun nests had held up previous attacks. The 6th East Yorkshire (Pioneers) overwhelmed the last defenders with smoke grenades and took 56 prisoners.

== Aftermath ==
=== Casualties ===
In the fighting around Pozières and Mouquet Farm, the I Anzac Corps suffered c. 6,300 casualties. During its second period on the Somme, the 1st Australian Division suffered 2,654 casualties, having already suffered 5,278 in August. The 2nd Australian Division incurred 6,846 casualties from 25 July to 7 August and another 1,267 from 23 to 29 August. From 29 July to 16 August the 4th Australian Division suffered 4,761 casualties and another 2,487 from 27 August to 4 September.

== Gallery ==
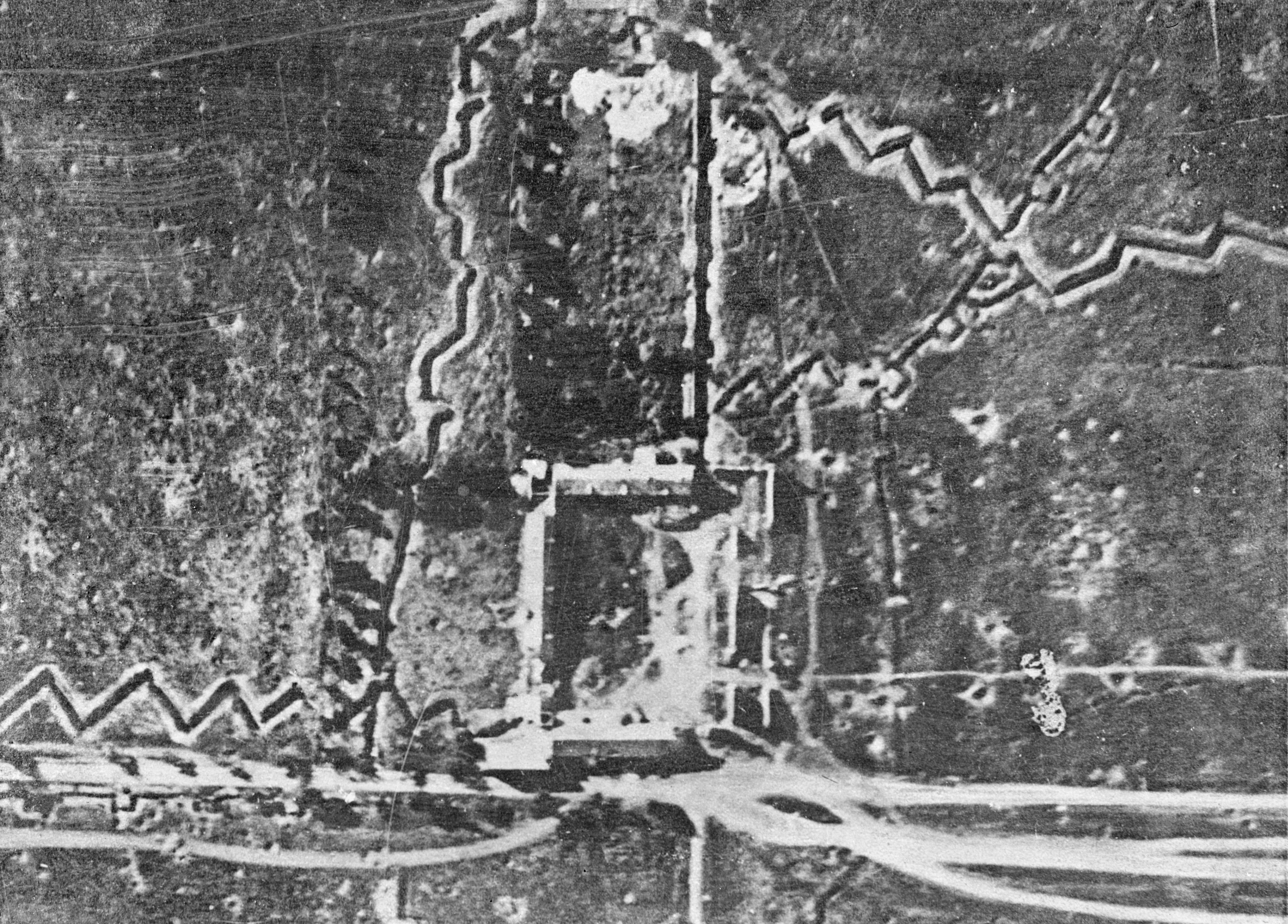
Mouquet Farm and its defences, June 1916 (Note: Ruins of farmhouse buildings are rectangular area at lower centre. Trench across top right is the western end of Fabeck Graben Trench at top left heading NNW is Zollern Redoubt. From lower centre a road not extant runs ENE to Courcelette; road at bottom heads SE towards Pozières; road running WSW at bottom left connects with Thiepval–Pozières road. The attacks were made from south to north, British on left and Australians centre and right)

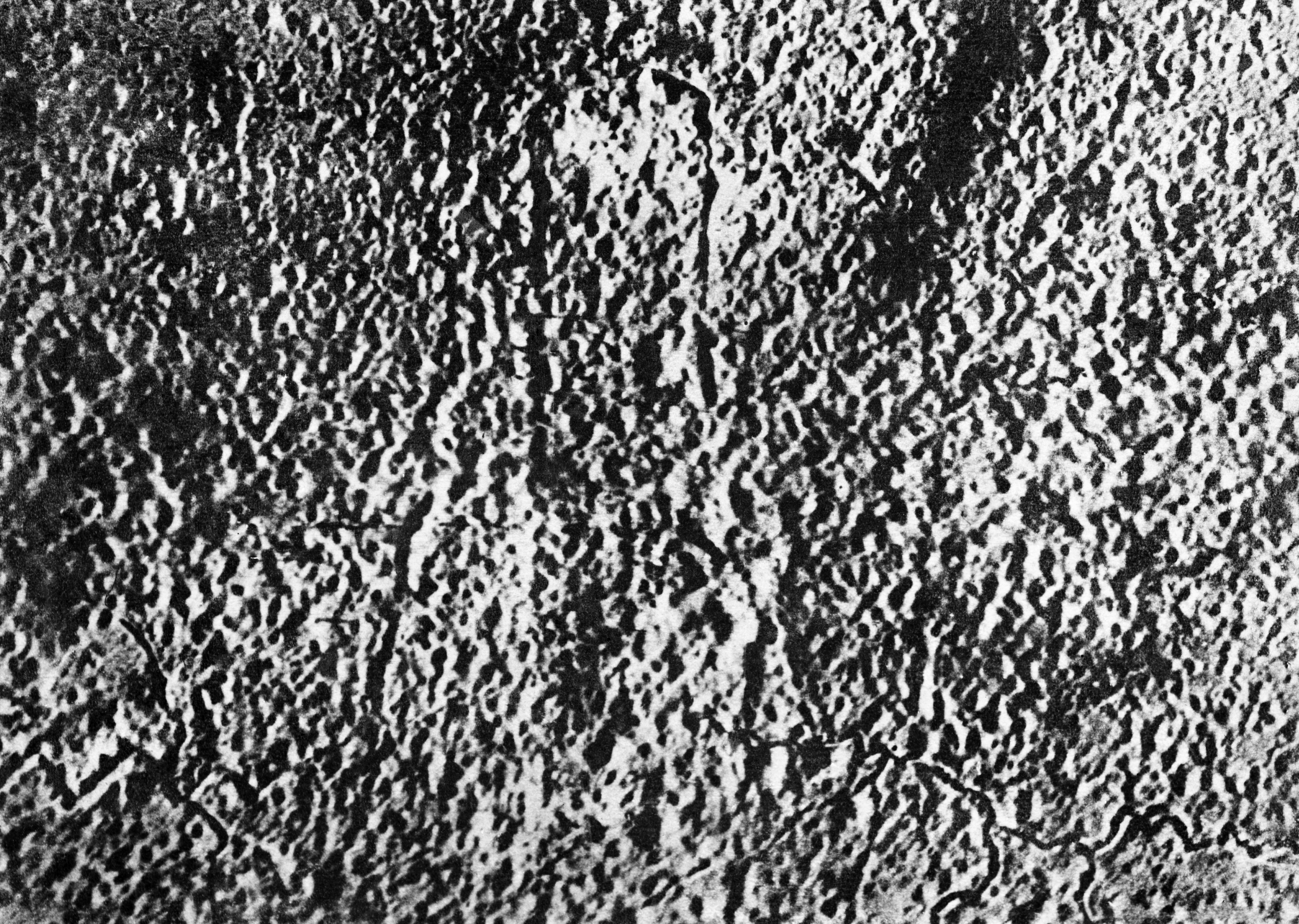
Mouquet Farm and its defences, September 1916 (Note: The farm building area is open land now and the rebuilt farm buildings are south of the road)

== See also ==
- Battle of the Somme: order of battle
