= 1st Machine Gun Battalion (Australia) =

Australian Army machine gun battalion

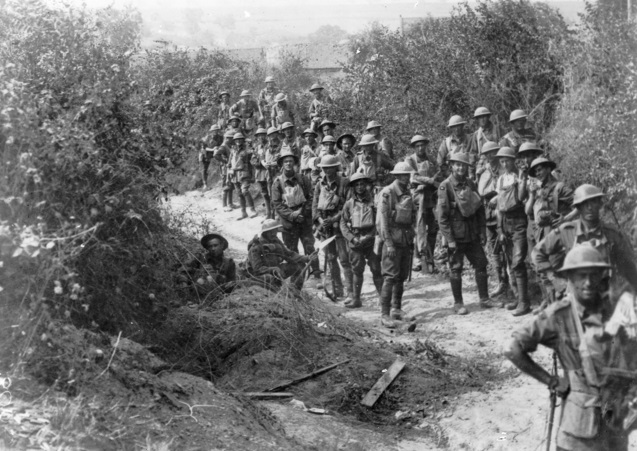
- Members of the 1st Machine Gun Company around Chuignolles, 23 August 1918
- Active: 1918–1919
- Country: Australia
- Branch: Australian Army
- Type: Infantry
- Role: Direct and indirect fire support
- Size: ~ 900 personnel
- Part of: 1st Division
- Engagements: World War I: German spring offensive; Hundred Days Offensive

Commanders
- Notable commanders: Iven Mackay

Insignia
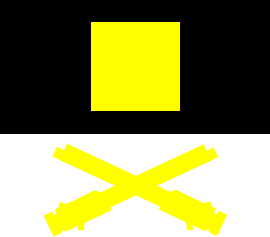
- Unit colour patch

The 1st Machine Gun Battalion was an infantry support unit of the Australian Army that was raised for service during World War I as part of the all volunteer Australian Imperial Force. It was one of five such units raised as part of the AIF during the war. Formed in March 1918, the battalion consisted of four machine gun companies, which had previously existed as independent companies assigned mainly at brigade level. The battalion consisted of 64 medium machine guns, and took part in the final stages of the war, seeing action during the Allied defensive operations during the German spring offensive and then the Allied Hundred Days Offensive, which finally brought an end to the war. The battalion was disbanded in mid-1919 during the demobilisation of the AIF.

== History ==
Assigned to the 1st Division, the unit was formed in France on 2 March 1918 from Australian Machine Gun Corps personnel, following a re-organisation of the AIF, which saw the previously independent machine gun companies that were assigned to each division being grouped together under a battalion structure. Each machine gun battalion had an authorized strength of 46 officers and 890 other ranks. The 1st Machine Gun Battalion consisted of four such companies, each equipped with 16 Vickers medium machine guns. Its constituent companies were the 1st, 2nd, 3rd and 21st Machine Gun Companies. The first three of these had been formed in Egypt in March 1916, and had been assigned to the 1st, 2nd and 3rd Brigades respectively, fighting with them through the early battles of Australia's involvement on the Western Front including Pozieres, Mouquet Farm and the Third Battle of Ypres. The 21st Machine Gun Company, however, had been formed in England in February 1917, initially as the 16th Machine Gun Company, with the intention that it would be assigned to the newly formed 16th Brigade, but it was redesignated in March 1917 and assigned to the 1st Division to supplement the brigade machine gun companies. The battalion's first commanding officer was Lieutenant Colonel Iven Mackay, and he led them through their first battle at Hazebrouck during the German spring offensive. After the German offensive was turned back, the battalion took part in the Allied Hundred Days Offensive, which finally brought an end to the war. The battalion was disbanded in mid-1919 during the demobilisation of the AIF.

The battalion's unit colour patch was a black and gold horizontal rectangle, which was usually worn above the crossed guns badge of the Machine Gun Corps. While the battalion's constituent companies had previously been issued distinctive UCPs, upon the formation of the battalion these were replaced by the single battalion style. The black and gold colours were chosen to signify that the unit as a machine gun unit, while the horizontal rectangle showed that the 1st Machine Gun Battalion was part of the 1st Division, which used the same shape UCP for the majority of its units.

A total of five such units would be raised by the AIF during the war: the 1st, 2nd, 3rd, 4th and 5th. The establishment of machine gun battalions within the AIF was the final step in the evolution of the organisation of direct fire support during the war. At the start of the war, Maxim machine guns had been assigned within line infantry battalions on a limited scale of two per battalion. As it was realised that there was a need for increased fire support, this was later increased to four guns per battalion, operated by a section of one officer and 32 other ranks. At the end of the Gallipoli Campaign, the AIF was reorganised, and the machine gun sections within each infantry battalion had been consolidated into companies assigned at brigade level. These companies had consisted of four sections, each equipped with four Vickers guns, operated by 10 officers and 142 other ranks. This had given each division a total of three such companies. In early 1917, this had been increased to four companies, with a total establishment of 50 officers and 870 other ranks. In addition, infantry battalions were provided with Lewis machine guns, on a scale of first eight and then up to 20 in 1918. During the final stages of the war, the machine gun battalions proved highly effective, providing both direct and indirect fire support during attacks. In the indirect role, they were used to fire barrages of machine gun fire into the rear areas behind the German defences over a prolonged period.

== Legacy ==
After the war, the concept of machine gun battalions was discontinued in the Australian Army and in the 1920s medium machine gun platoons were added to the organization of standard infantry battalions. However, the machine gun battalion was revived again in 1937 as fears of war in Europe surfaced again, and four Australian Light Horse regiments – the 1st, 16th, 17th and 18th – were converted into machine gun regiments. Following the outbreak of World War II, four machine gun battalions were eventually raised as part of the Second Australian Imperial Force, each assigned at divisional level. Several more units were raised within the Militia including the 6th and 7th Machine Gun Battalions, which served in New Guinea, while several more light horse regiments were also converted for home defence, including: the 14th, 19th, 25th and 26th. The 5th Machine Gun Battalion was also re-raised and undertook garrison duties as part of Torres Strait Force. At the end of that war, though, the decision was made to return machine guns to the establishment of individual infantry battalions and consequently since then no further machine gun battalions have been raised as part of the Australian Army.

According to Alexander Rodger, as a result of the decision not to re-raise machine gun battalions in the early interwar years, no battle honours were subsequently awarded to the 1st Machine Gun Battalion – or any other First World War machine gun battalion – as there was no equivalent unit to perpetuate the honours when they were promulgated by the Australian Army in 1927.
