= 3rd Machine Gun Battalion =

Australian Army machine gun battalion

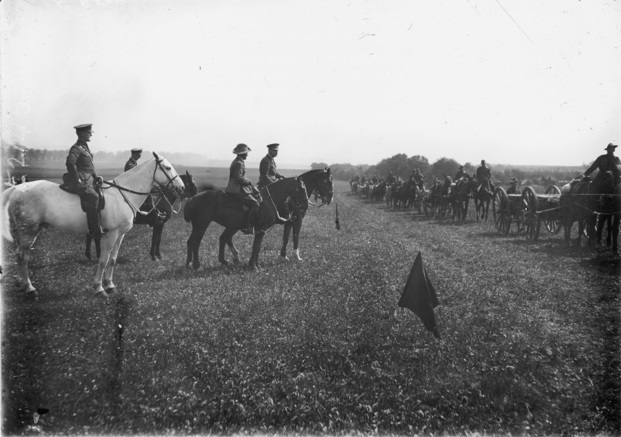
- 3rd Machine Gun Battalion on parade, 1918
- Active: 1918–1919
- Country: Australia
- Branch: Australian Army
- Type: Infantry
- Role: Direct and indirect fire support
- Size: ~ 900 personnel
- Part of: 3rd Division
- Engagements: World War I: German spring offensive; Hundred Days Offensive

Commanders
- Notable commanders: Archibald Blacklow

Insignia
- Unit colour patch

The 3rd Machine Gun Battalion was an infantry support unit of the Australian Army. Originally formed in March 1918 for service during World War I as part of the all volunteer Australian Imperial Force, it was one of five such units raised as part of the AIF during the war. The battalion consisted of four machine gun companies, which had previously existed as independent companies assigned mainly at brigade level. The battalion took part in the final stages of the war, seeing action during the Allied defensive operations during the German spring offensive and then the Allied Hundred Days Offensive, which finally brought an end to the war. The battalion was disbanded in mid-1919 during the demobilisation of the AIF following the conclusion of hostilities.

== History ==
Originally formed in March 1918 for service during World War I as part of the all volunteer Australian Imperial Force, the 3rd Machine Gun Battalion was one of five such units raised as part of the AIF during the war. Assigned to the 3rd Division, and consisting of personnel from the Australian Machine Gun Corps, the battalion had an authorised strength of 46 officers and 890 other ranks, and it consisted of four machine gun companies – the 9th, 10th, 11th and 23rd – which had previously existed as independent companies mainly assigned at brigade level. While independent, these companies had been regionally affiliated with various states within Australia from where their recruits were drawn; however, with the establishment of the battalion identity, this affiliation was discontinued and the battalion became an "all states" unit.

The establishment of machine gun battalions within the AIF was the final step in the evolution of the organisation of direct fire support during the war. At the start of the war, Maxim machine guns had been assigned within line infantry battalions on a limited scale of two per battalion. As it was realised that there was a need for increased fire support, this was later increased to four guns per battalion, operated by a section of one officer and 32 other ranks. At the end of the Gallipoli Campaign, the AIF was reorganised and expanded in preparation for its transfer to the Western Front, and the machine gun sections within each infantry battalion had been consolidated into companies assigned at brigade level. The battalion's commanding officer on formation was Lieutenant Colonel Archibald Blacklow, who had previously served in both the 35th and 36th Infantry Battalions.

The first three of battalion's constituent companies had been formed in Australia – in New South Wales, Victoria and Queensland – in February 1916 during a period when the AIF was being expanded in preparation for its transfer to the Western Front following the end of the disastrous Gallipoli Campaign. At that time they had been assigned to the 9th, 10th and 11th Brigades respectively, arriving in the United Kingdom in mid-1916. These companies had undertaken advanced training with the 3rd Division on Salisbury Plain in the United Kingdom as the division was prepared for the rigours of trench warfare, before arriving on the Western Front in late 1916. They had subsequently taken part in the fighting around Messines and Ypres in 1917. The 23rd Machine Gun Company, however, had been formed in England in January 1917. The company was briefly re-designated as the 16th Machine Gun Company as part of plans to raise the 16th Brigade, but returned to its original designation in August 1917 when the 16th Brigade was disbanded without having seen combat due to manpower shortages. When the decision was made to assign an extra company at divisional level so that each division had four companies, the company was assigned to the 3rd Division.

The battalion's unit colour patch (UCP) was a black and gold oval, which was usually worn above the crossed guns badge of the Machine Gun Corps. While the battalion's constituent companies had previously been issued distinctive UCPs, upon the formation of the battalion these were replaced by the single battalion style. The black and gold colours were chosen to signify that the unit as a machine gun unit, while the oval showed that the 3rd Machine Gun Battalion was part of the 3rd Division, which used the same shape UCP for the majority of its units.

The battalion was equipped with a total of 64 Vickers medium machine guns – assigned at a scale of 16 per company – and took part in the final stages of the war, seeing action during the Allied defensive operations during the German spring offensive and then the Allied Hundred Days Offensive, which finally brought an end to the war. During these battles, the battalion was employed to provide enfilade fire in defence, and plunging fire in support of attacking infantry forces, engaging targets out to 3,000 yards (2,700 m). Due to the exposed position from which the machine gunners fired, they suffered heavy casualties. Following the conclusion of hostilities, the battalion was disbanded in mid-1919 during the demobilisation of the AIF. The battalion was disbanded in mid-1919 during the demobilisation of the AIF following the conclusion of hostilities.

== Legacy ==
After the war, the machine gun battalion concept was discontinued in the Australian Army and in the 1920s medium machine gun platoons were added to the organization of standard infantry battalions. However, the machine gun battalion was revived again in 1937 as fears of war in Europe surfaced again, and four Australian Light Horse regiments – the 1st, 16th, 17th and 18th – were converted into machine gun regiments. Following the outbreak of World War II, four machine gun battalions were eventually raised as part of the Second Australian Imperial Force, each assigned at divisional level. Several more units were raised within the Militia including the 6th and 7th Machine Gun Battalions, which served in New Guinea, while several more light horse regiments were also converted for home defence, including the 14th, 19th, 25th and 26th. The 5th Machine Gun Battalion was also re-raised and undertook garrison duties as part of Torres Strait Force. At the end of that war, though, the decision was made to return machine guns to the establishment of individual infantry battalions and consequently since then no further machine gun battalions have been raised as part of the Australian Army.

According to Alexander Rodger, as a result of the decision not to re-raise machine gun battalions in the early interwar years, no battle honours were subsequently awarded to the 3rd Machine Gun Battalion – or any other First World War machine gun battalion – as there was no equivalent unit to perpetuate the honours when they were promulgated by the Australian Army in 1927.
