= 2nd Machine Gun Battalion =

Australian Army machine gun battalion

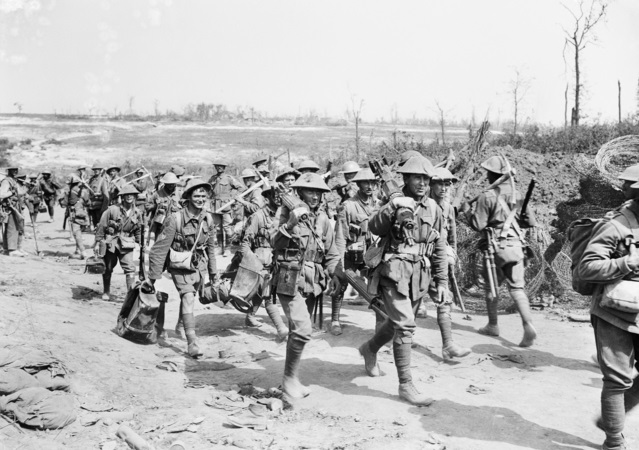
- Machine gunners from the 5th, 6th or 7th Machine Gun Companies
- Active: 1918–1919
- Country: Australia
- Branch: Australian Army
- Type: Infantry
- Role: Direct and indirect fire support
- Size: ~ 900 personnel
- Part of: 2nd Division
- Engagements: World War I: German spring offensive; Hundred Days Offensive

Insignia
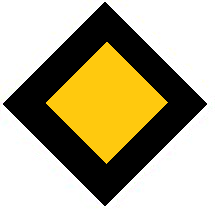
- Unit colour patch

The 2nd Machine Gun Battalion was an infantry support unit of the Australian Army that was raised for service during World War I as part of the all volunteer Australian Imperial Force. It was one of five such units raised as part of the AIF during the war. Formed in March 1918, the battalion consisted of four machine gun companies, which had previously existed as independent companies assigned mainly at brigade level. The battalion consisted of 64 medium machine guns, and took part in the final stages of the war, seeing action during the Allied defensive operations during the German spring offensive and then the Allied Hundred Days Offensive, which finally brought an end to the war. The battalion was disbanded in mid-1919 during the demobilisation of the AIF.

== History ==
One of five such units raised as part of the AIF during the war as part of the Australian Machine Gun Corps, the 2nd Machine Gun Battalion was formed in March 1918 as part of the 2nd Division. It consisted of four machine gun companies, which had previously existed as independent companies assigned mainly at brigade level. These were the 5th, 6th, 7th and the 22nd. The battalion's first commanding officer was Lieutenant Colonel Alexander Windeyer Ralston, previously of the 20th Infantry Battalion. The battalion's authorised strength was 46 officers and 890 other ranks.

The establishment of machine gun battalions within the AIF was the final step in the evolution of the organisation of direct fire support during the war. At the start of the war, Maxim machine guns had been assigned within line infantry battalions on a limited scale of two per battalion. As it was realised that there was a need for increased fire support, this was later increased to four guns per battalion, operated by a section of one officer and 32 other ranks. At the end of the Gallipoli Campaign, the AIF was reorganised and expanded in preparation for its transfer to the Western Front, and the machine gun sections within each infantry battalion had been consolidated into companies assigned at brigade level.

The first three of battalion's constituent companies had been formed in Egypt in March 1916 and at that time they had been assigned to the 5th, 6th and 7th Brigades respectively, arriving in Europe in mid-1916. These companies had fought through the early battles following the Australians' arrival in Europe, including Pozieres, Bullecourt and Third Ypres. The 22nd Machine Gun Company, however, had been formed in England in January 1917. Initially, the company had been designated the 17th Machine Gun Company, with the intention that it would be assigned to the newly forming 17th Brigade, but later the decision was made to assign the extra company at divisional level so that each division had four companies, and in March 1917, the company was redesignated as the 22nd and assigned to the 2nd Division, arriving in France at the end of the month, during the fighting around Ypres.

The battalion's unit colour patch (UCP) was a black and gold diamond, which was usually worn above the crossed guns badge of the Machine Gun Corps. While the battalion's constituent companies had previously been issued distinctive UCPs, upon the formation of the battalion these were replaced by the single battalion style. The black and gold colours were chosen to signify that the unit as a machine gun unit, while the diamond showed that the 2nd Machine Gun Battalion was part of the 2nd Division, which used the same shape UCP for the majority of its units.

The battalion was equipped with a total of 64 Vickers medium machine guns – assigned at a scale of 16 per company – and took part in the final stages of the war, seeing action during the Allied defensive operations during the German spring offensive and then the Allied Hundred Days Offensive, which finally brought an end to the war. During these battles, the battalion was employed to provide enfilade fire in defence, and plunging fire in support of attacking infantry forces, engaging targets out to 3,000 yards (2,700 m). Due to the exposed position from which the machine gunners fired, they suffered heavy casualties. Following the conclusion of hostilities, the battalion was disbanded in mid-1919 during the demobilisation of the AIF. One member of the battalion, Lieutenant Edgar Towner, received the Victoria Cross for his actions during the war. Another soldier, Sergeant Claud Castleton, received the award while serving as part of the 5th Machine Gun Company, prior to its incorporation into the battalion.

== Legacy ==
After the war, the machine gun battalion concept was discontinued in the Australian Army and in the 1920s medium machine gun platoons were added to the organisation of standard infantry battalions. However, the machine gun battalion was revived again in 1937 as fears of war in Europe surfaced again, and four Australian Light Horse regiments – the 1st, 16th, 17th and 18th – were converted into machine gun regiments. Following the outbreak of World War II, four machine gun battalions were eventually raised as part of the Second Australian Imperial Force, each assigned at divisional level. Several more units were raised within the Militia including the 6th and 7th Machine Gun Battalions, which served in New Guinea, while several more light horse regiments were also converted for home defence including the 14th, 19th, 25th and 26th. The 5th Machine Gun Battalion was also re-raised and undertook garrison duties as part of Torres Strait Force. At the end of that war, though, the decision was made to return machine guns to the establishment of individual infantry battalions and consequently since then no further machine gun battalions have been raised as part of the Australian Army.

According to Alexander Rodger, as a result of the decision not to re-raise machine gun battalions in the early interwar years, no battle honours were subsequently awarded to the 2nd Machine Gun Battalion – or any other First World War machine gun battalion – as there was no equivalent unit to perpetuate the honours when they were promulgated by the Australian Army in 1927.
