= 29th/46th Battalion (Australia) =

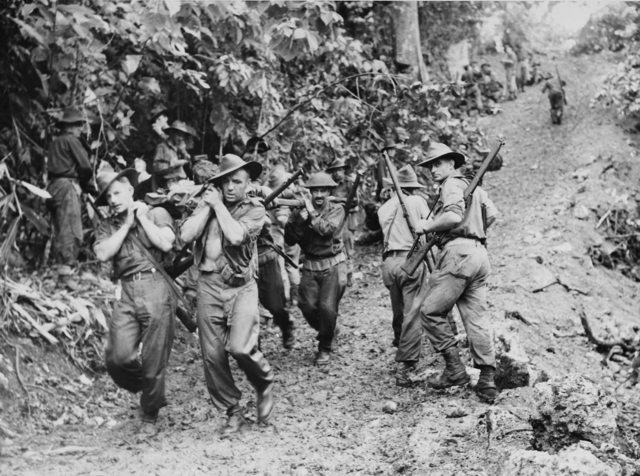
- Soldiers from the 29th/46th Battalion evacuate a wounded comrade following fighting around Gusika on New Guinea, November 1943
- Active: 1942–46
- Country: Australia
- Branch: Australian Army
- Type: Infantry
- Size: ~800–900 men (Note: At the start of the war, the normal size of an Australian infantry battalion was 910 men all ranks, however, following the reorganisation of the 5th Division along the jungle establishment, the size dropped to 803 men all ranks.)
- Part of: 4th Brigade, 5th Division
- Nickname: East Melbourne Regiment/Brighton Rifles
- Colours: Black alongside yellow
- Engagements: Second World War: Huon Peninsula campaign; New Britain campaign

Insignia
- Unit colour patch

The 29th/46th Battalion was an infantry battalion of the Australian Army. It was formed in August 1942 by the amalgamation of two previously existing Militia battalions, the 29th and 46th, which were merged following a decision by the Australian government to release manpower from the military back into industry to meet the nation's increased production requirements. Initially the 29th/46th, serving as part of the 4th Brigade, undertook garrison duties in Australia, however, in 1943 the battalion was deployed to New Guinea where it garrisoned Milne Bay before subsequently taking part in the Huon Peninsula campaign in support of the 9th Division. In late 1944, after being deployed for over a year and a half, the battalion returned to Australia for a brief period of leave and reorganisation. In early 1945, however, they were again deployed overseas, this time to the island of New Britain where they undertook a campaign to contain the large Japanese garrison. Following the end of the war the battalion was disbanded in June 1946.

== History ==
=== Formation ===
In mid-1942, as a result of serious manpower shortages in the Australian economy that occurred because of an over mobilisation of its military forces, the Australian government decided to return a significant number of service personnel to the civilian industry by reducing the size of the Army. In order to achieve this, a number of Militia infantry battalions were disbanded while others were amalgamated. The 29th/46th Battalion was one of the battalions that was formed at this time, being raised in August 1942 through the merger of two previously existing units: the 29th Battalion (East Melbourne Regiment) and the 46th Battalion (Brighton Rifles). Upon formation the battalion adopted the territorial title of the "East Melbourne Regiment/Brighton Rifles" in order to perpetuate the identity of its predecessor units. Assigned to the 4th Brigade along with the 22nd and 37th Battalions, the battalion initially undertook garrison duties and training in Queensland, being stationed at Warwick, Brisbane, Caloundra and Maroochydore at this time.

=== New Guinea ===
In February 1943, with the passing of the Defence (Citizens Military Forces) Act 1943, the role of the Militia was clarified with the Act expanding the geographical area in which such units could be deployed to include all of New Guinea and parts of the Netherlands East Indies, Borneo and the Solomon Islands. (Note: At the same time, Militia units that had 75 per cent of their actual strength, or 65 per cent of their wartime strength, volunteer for "overseas service" outside the geographical area prescribed by the Act, were gazetted as Australian Imperial Force (AIF) units and were deemed able to be deployed anywhere they were required.) The following month, under the command of Lieutenant Colonel Kenneth Cusworth—who would serve as the battalion's commanding officer throughout its existence—the battalion was sent to New Guinea, along with the rest of the 4th Brigade, to reinforce the garrison at Milne Bay, where units from the 7th Brigade had turned back a Japanese landing the previous year.

Upon arrival, the brigade was attached to the 5th Division, which had been converted to the jungle establishment, and the battalion undertook various garrison duties as well intensive jungle training and patrols. In September 1943, the 4th Brigade was detached from the 5th Division and dispatched to Lae, where it was tasked to take over the beachhead from troops of the 9th Division that were taking part in the fighting in Huon Peninsula campaign. They arrived on 11 September 1943, having been dispatched aboard 12 LCTs and LCIs, and slowly began to relieve the troops of the 20th Brigade. Following this the 29th/46th Battalion began patrolling operations inland around Sattleberg, with a company being detached from the battalion as part of 'Tilley Force' to pursue the Japanese 51st Division which was fleeing inland, before the entire brigade, less Tilley Force, was dispatched to Finschhafen in late October. In early November the company that had been sent inland returned to the battalion at Finschhafen, arriving there on 8 November 1943.

In early December the Australian offensive was renewed and as part of this, it was decided that the 4th Brigade would play a more direct part. The brigade was to join in the advance from the coast at Gusika to Lakona and as a result, in order to benefit from the lessons in jungle warfare that had been learned by the 9th Division so far, the three Militia battalions were reinforced with training teams of experienced Australian Imperial Force personnel. As a part of the advance to Lakona, the 4th Brigade was tasked with capturing Fortification Hill and the 29th/46th was chosen to lead the advance along with a company from the 37th/52nd Battalion. (Note: In support of the battalion were two platoons from the 2/2nd Machine Gun Battalion, a troop of tanks from the 1st Tank Battalion, a battery of artillery, and engineers from the 2/7th Field Company. A company from the 37th/52nd Battalion and a platoon from the 1st New Guinea Infantry Battalion, grouped together as "Macforce", provided flank protection.) Stepping off on 5 December 1943, the advance took place in three bounds, firstly to the west towards Kamlagidu Point and to the north of the Lagoon, before turning towards Kiligia.

Encountering sporadic, but nonetheless stiff opposition, the 29th/46th advanced up the coast, suffering casualties from an enemy that was expert at remaining hidden in the jungle and from mines that were laid along the various tracks that snaked through the dense scrub. By 10 December they reached Kiligia, from which the Japanese garrison had withdrawn prior to their arrival, and after a brief pause as further artillery support was brought up, the advance continued on towards the Sanga River as Japanese troops from the 80th Regiment rushed to contain the Australians. On 17 December, the 29th/46th conducted a complicated passage of lines manoeuvre, passing through the 22nd Battalion, and with considerable artillery support proceeded to continue the advance up the coast crossing near the mouth of the Sanga. By the afternoon of the following day they had reached the Masaweng River, where they captured a quantity of Japanese weapons which had been abandoned on the opposite bank. After this the focus of the advance became the imposing feature of Fortification Hill and after the brigade commander moved his headquarters up to Kiligia, the 29th/46th Battalion began the advance on 19 December. Receiving sporadic Japanese mortar fire, which was met by overwhelming direct and indirect fire support from accompanying tanks and artillery, the battalion reached the summit of the hill the following day as the Japanese defenders abandoned the position.

After this, the 4th Brigade was assigned to the rear areas as the advance continued towards Madang. In April 1944, the 29th/46th arrived there and for the next four months they provided a garrison force, before finally, in September 1944, having been deployed for almost a year and a half, the battalion received orders to return to Australia for leave and reorganisation.

=== New Britain ===
After reforming at Strathpine, Queensland, the battalion was deployed to New Britain in January 1945 for its final campaign of the war. On New Britain, two brigades—the 6th and the 13th—from the Australian 5th Division had taken over from the US 40th Division in November 1944, and after landing at Jacquinot Bay, they had commenced a campaign designed to contain the Japanese forces stationed on the island. Allied intelligence had estimated these forces at around 38,000 personnel although it was later determined that this figure was closer to 93,000. As a result, it was decided to limit operations on New Britain to isolating the Japanese forces under General Hitoshi Imamura to their base in the Gazelle Peninsula, while wresting control of the main part of the island to the south of the line Wide Bay–Open Bay.

Due to a shortage of shipping, the 4th Brigade arrived behind the main force, with the 29th/46th arriving on the island in late January 1945. Following this, the 29th/46th Battalion was established to the south of the anchorage in Jacquinot Bay, around Wunung Bay. The Japanese resistance in the battalion's area of responsibility was limited and as a result training and long range patrols to the north and south of Jacquinot Bay occupied most of its time during this period. The only action encountered by the battalion was from the sections of reinforcements who were sent to Wide Bay to gain jungle warfare experience with the 13th Brigade who occupied the patrol line till the end of the war. By May 1945, the Australian advance had reached its limit of exploitation as the 5th Division reached the base of the Gazelle Peninsula and after this although patrol operations continued, only small scale clashes occurred, until the surrender of Japanese forces in August 1945.

=== Disbandment ===
Following the end of hostilities the battalion remained in New Britain and in September 1945 the 29th/46th Battalion led the 4th Australian Infantry Brigade ashore to occupy Rabaul where they were used to guard Japanese prisoners of war that were awaiting repatriation back to Japan. Over time, however, the 29th/46th's numbers began to dwindle as men with the appropriate number of points were returned to Australia to await demobilisation and discharge. By June 1946 this process was completed and the battalion was disbanded.

During the course of the war, the 29th/46th Battalion had 38 men killed in action or died on active service, while a further 63 were wounded. Members of the battalion received the following decorations: one Military Cross, three Military Medals and six Mentions in Despatches.

== Battle honours ==
The 29th/46th received the following battle honours for its service during the war:

- South-West Pacific 1942–1945, Liberation of Australian New Guinea; Gusika–Fortification Point.

== Notes ==
Footnotes

Citations
