= 29th Battalion (Australia) =

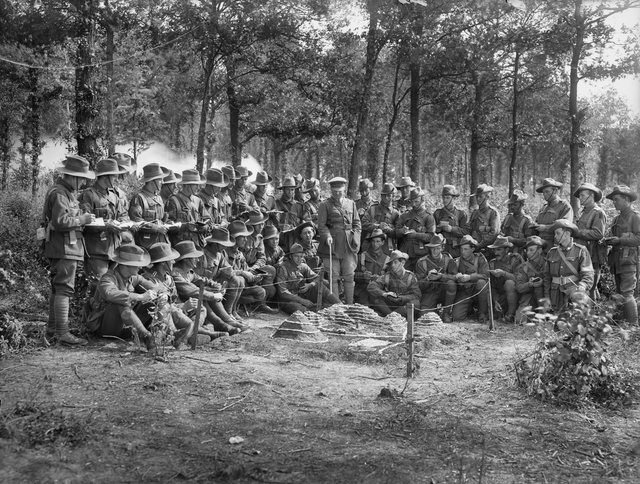
- Members of the 8th Brigade, including soldiers from the 29th Battalion, AIF, undertaking a map reading class on the Somme in July 1918
- Active: 1915–1918; 1921–1930; 1939–1942
- Country: Australia
- Branch: Australian Army
- Type: Infantry
- Size: ~900–1,000 men (Note: During the First World War, the authorised establishment of an Australian infantry battalion was 1,023 men. By the start of the Second World War, the normal size of an Australian infantry battalion was 910 men all ranks.)
- Part of: 8th Brigade, 5th Division; 4th Brigade, 3rd Division
- Nickname: East Melbourne Regiment
- Colours: Black alongside gold
- Engagements: First World War: Western Front; Second World War

Insignia
- Unit colour patch

The 29th Battalion was an infantry battalion of the Australian Army. First formed in 1915 for service during the First World War as part of the Australian Imperial Force (AIF), it fought in the trenches of the Western Front in France and Belgium before being disbanded in late 1918 to provide reinforcements for other heavily depleted Australian units. In 1921, following the demobilisation of the AIF, the battalion was re-raised as a unit of Australia's part-time military forces, based in Melbourne, Victoria, before being amalgamated with the 22nd Battalion in 1930. It was later re-raised in its own right and, following the outbreak of the Second World War, undertook garrison duties in Australia before being amalgamated with the 46th Battalion to form the 29th/46th Battalion in late 1942, subsequently seeing service against the Japanese in New Guinea and on New Britain.

== History ==
=== First World War ===
The 29th Battalion was originally formed during the First World War, being raised in Victoria as part of the Australian Imperial Force (AIF) on 10 August 1915. Under the command of Lieutenant Colonel Alfred Bennett, an officer with over 20 years service in the part-time military forces, the battalion undertook initial training at Seymour and then later Broadmeadows Camp along with the three other battalions of the 8th Brigade, to which it was assigned. In November 1915, the battalion embarked upon the troopship HMAT Ascanius in Port Melbourne and departed Australian waters, disembarking at Port Suez, Egypt on 7 December 1915. The battalion arrived in the Middle East too late to take part in the fighting at Gallipoli, and as a result they were initially used to undertake defensive duties to protect the Suez Canal from Ottoman forces. They also undertook a comprehensive training program and by the time their orders arrived to transfer to Europe in June 1916, they had reached their peak. They subsequently embarked the troopship HMT Tunisian in Alexandria, bound for France on 14 June. Upon the battalion's arrival in Egypt, the 8th Brigade had been unattached at divisional level, but in early 1916, it was assigned to the 5th Division, after a reorganisation that saw the AIF expanded from two infantry divisions to five.

The battalion arrived at Marseille on 23 June and afterwards was transported by rail to Hazebrouck. On 8 July the 5th Division was called up to the front from training behind lines in order to replace the battalions of the Australian 4th Division which were being transferred to the Somme. The 29th Battalion undertook a difficult two-day 29-mile (47 km) approach march over cobbled roads with loads of up to 70–75 pounds (32–34 kg) before arriving at the front on the night of 10/11 July. Taking up a position between Boutillerie and Condonerrie in the Bois Grenier, they relieved the 13th Battalion and on 19 July subsequently took part in an attack against the German positions around the "Delangre Farm" which was being held by the 21st Bavarian Reserve Infantry Regiment. Following the attack, the battalion held the line for another 11 days, beating off a particularly heavy German counterattack on 20 July, before they were eventually relieved. During their introduction to trench warfare, the 29th Battalion lost 52 men killed in action, and another 164 men wounded.

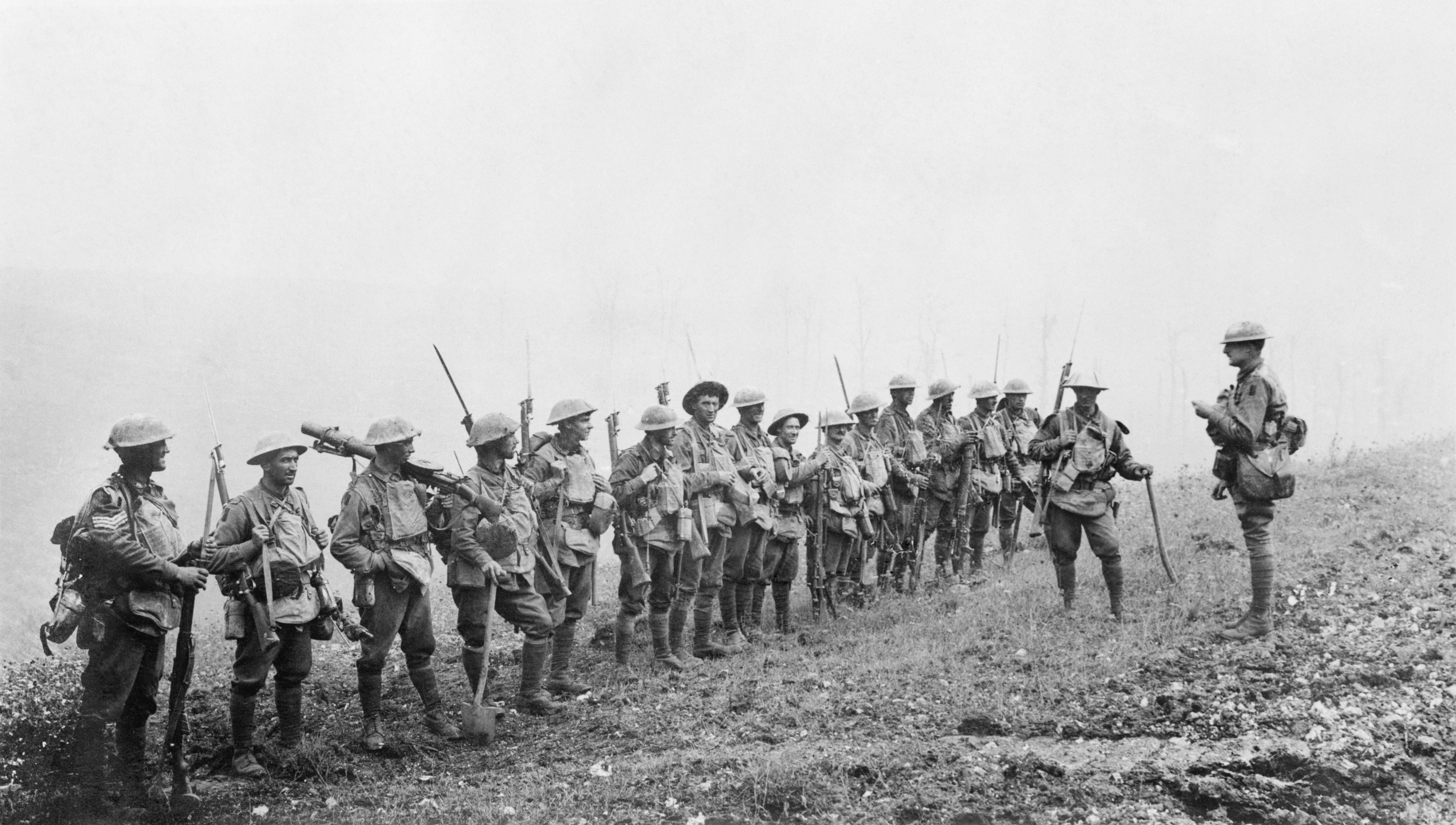
A platoon commander from the 29th Battalion addresses his troops, 8 August 1918

For the next two and half years they fought in a number of major battles in the trenches along the Western Front including Polygon Wood, Amiens and the St Quentin Canal, as well as playing a supporting role in a number of others including Bullecourt and Morlancourt. During the Allied Hundred Days Offensive that was launched on 8 August 1918, the battalion took part in the 8th Brigade's advance up the treacherous Morcourt Valley, subsequently achieving a considerable feat by capturing the town of Vauvillers. The battalion fought its last battle of the war in late September alongside the US 30th Infantry Division, when they breached the German defences along the Hindenburg Line as part of the final Allied offensive of the war. Aimed at the Le Catelet Line near Bellicourt, the battalion began its advance on Nauroy on 29 September, moving on the left flank beside elements of the US 117th Infantry Regiment, with the 32nd Battalion in support. The attack proved highly successful and 59 prisoners were captured along with four field guns and a quantity of German small arms. Against this the battalion lost 17 men killed and 63 wounded.

Following this, they were withdrawn from the front line. By this time casualties amongst the Australian Corps had reached critical level and as a result many battalions—from an authorised strength of over 1,000 men—were only able to field between 300 and 400. As a result, the decision was made to reduce the number of infantry battalions in each brigade from four to three by disbanding one battalion and using its personnel to reinforce the others. The 29th Battalion was one of those chosen to be broken up and as a result on 19 October 1918, the 29th Battalion was disbanded. The majority of the battalion's personnel—29 officers and 517 other ranks—were transferred to the 32nd Battalion as reinforcements.

During its service on the Western Front, the battalion suffered 485 men killed and another 1,399 men wounded. Members of the battalion received the following decorations: three Distinguished Service Orders and one Bar, one Member of the Order of the British Empire, 20 Military Crosses, 17 Distinguished Conduct Medals, 94 Military Medals with three Bars, three Meritorious Service Medals, 17 Mentions in Despatches and five awards from other Allied nations. (Note: There is some discrepancy in the sources about the numbers of decorations. Austin provides the following figures: three DSOs and one bar, one Officer of the Order of the British Empire, 22 MCs, 17 DCMs, 97 MMs and four Bars, three MSMs, 22 MIDs, and eight foreign awards.) The 29th Battalion was bestowed 19 battle honours in 1927 for its involvement in the war.

=== Inter-war years ===
The battalion was re-raised in 1921 as part the re-organisation of the Australian military that took place at that time, with the battalion becoming a part-time unit of the Citizen Forces, assigned to the 4th Brigade, 3rd Division. Upon formation, the battalion drew its personnel from four previously existing Citizen Forces units: the 2nd Battalion, 29th Infantry Regiment; the 5th Battalion, 6th Infantry Regiment; 5th Battalion, 15th Infantry Regiment and part of the 29th Light Horse, and perpetuated the battle honours and traditions of its associated AIF battalion. Based in Melbourne, the battalion was brought up to its authorised strength of around 1,000 men through the compulsory training scheme. The following year, however, the Army's budget was cut in half and the scope of the scheme reduced following the resolution of the Washington Naval Treaty which arguably improved Australia's strategic outlook. As a result of this, the battalion's authorised strength was reduced to just 409 men of all ranks and training and recruitment were scaled back significantly.

In 1927, territorial titles were introduced into the Australian Army and the battalion adopted the title of the "East Melbourne Regiment". At this time, the battalion was afforded the motto Nulli Secundus. In 1929, following the election of the Scullin Labor government, the compulsory training scheme was suspended altogether as it was decided to maintain the part-time military force on a volunteer-only basis. In order to reflect the change, the Citizen Forces was renamed the "Militia" at this time. The end of compulsory training and the fiscal austerity that followed with the economic downturn of the Great Depression meant that the manpower available to many Militia units at this time dropped well below their authorised establishments and as a result the decision was made to amalgamate a number of units. Subsequently, the 29th Battalion was amalgamated with the 22nd in 1930, forming the 29th/22nd Battalion, although they were later split again in August 1939 and the 29th re-raised in its own right.

=== Second World War and beyond ===
Following the outbreak of the Second World War, the Australian government decided to raise an all-volunteer force for service overseas due to the provisions of the Defence Act (1903), which precluded compelling the Militia to serve outside of Australian territory. This force was known as the Second Australian Imperial Force (2nd AIF). Although the 2nd AIF would be raised upon a cadre of trained officers and non-commissioned officers drawn from the Militia, the Militia's main role at this time was to provide training to the men called up as part of the compulsory training scheme that was readopted in early 1940. Throughout 1940–41 the battalion undertook a number of short periods of continuous training, however, following the Japanese bombing of Pearl Harbor and invasion of Malaya in December 1941, it was mobilised for war service.

In March 1942, the 4th Brigade was sent to Queensland to undertake garrison duties and man defences along the coast to defend against a possible Japanese invasion. By mid-1942, however, due to manpower shortages that occurred in the Australian economy as a result of over mobilisation of its military forces, the Australian government decided to disband a number of Militia units in order to release their personnel back into the civilian workforce. As a result of this decision, in August 1942, the 29th Battalion was amalgamated with the 46th Battalion to form the 29th/46th Battalion. This unit went on to serve overseas in New Guinea and on New Britain. After the war, following the demobilisation of the wartime Army, Australia's part-time military was re-formed in 1948, but the 29th Battalion was not re-raised at the time. In 1961, although the battalion was in a state of suspended animation, it was entrusted with the four battle honours awarded to the 2/29th Battalion for its service in Malaya during World War II and the three earned by the 29th/46th Battalion.

== Battle honours ==
The 29th Battalion received the following battle honours (including those inherited from the 2/29th):

- First World War: Somme 1916, '18; Bapaume 1917; Bullecourt, Ypres 1917; Menin Road; Polygon Wood; Poelcappelle; Passchendaele; Ancre 1918; Amiens; Albert 1918; Mont St Quentin; Hindenburg Line; St. Quentin Canal; France and Flanders 1916–18; Egypt 1915–16. (Note: Austin lists the battalion's battle honours as: Somme 1916–18, Bullecourt, Menin Road, Poelcappelle, Ancre 1918, Albert 1918, Hindenburg Line, France, Egypt, Bapaume 1917, Ypres 1917, Polygon Wood, Passchendaele, Amiens, Mont St Quentin, St Quentin Canal, Flanders.)
- Second World War: Malaya 1941–42, Johore, The Muar, Singapore Island, South West Pacific 1944–45, Liberation of Australian New Guinea, Gusika–Fortification Point.

== Alliances ==
- United Kingdom – The Worcestershire Regiment.

== Notes ==
Footnotes

Citations
