= Robert Smith (Australian Army officer) =

Australian Army officer

- Born: 4 September 1881; Richmond, Victoria
- Died: 14 July 1928 (aged 46); Geelong, Victoria
- Burial place: Geelong Eastern Cemetery
- Military career
- Allegiance: Australia
- Branch: Australian Army
- Service years: 1907–1928
- Rank: Brigadier General
- Commands: 5th Brigade (1917–18); 22nd Battalion (1916)
- Conflicts: First World War; Gallipoli campaign; Battle of Lone Pine; Western Front; Battle of Pozières; Battle of Mouquet Farm; Second Battle of Bullecourt; Battle of the Menin Road Ridge; Battle of Broodseinde; Battle of Poelcappelle; First Battle of Villers-Bretonneux
- Awards: Companion of the Order of St Michael and St George; Distinguished Service Order & Bar; Colonial Auxiliary Forces Officers' Decoration; Mentioned in Despatches (4); Croix de guerre (Belgium)

Brigadier General Robert Smith, CMG, DSO & Bar, VD (4 September 1881 – 14 July 1928) was an Australian wool merchant and a senior officer in the Australian Army during the First World War.

He was promoted to the command of a brigade in January 1917.

Smith served as president of the Geelong Football Club from 1921–1922.
