= Australian Machine Gun Corps =

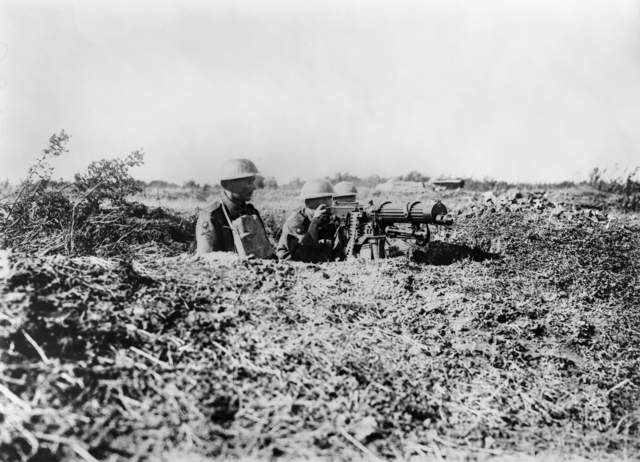
- Machine gunners from the 24th Company, 4th Machine Gun Battalion, September 1918.
- Active: 1916–19
- Country: Australia
- Branch: Australia
- Role: Direct and indirect fire support
- Size: 15 companies (1916); 5 battalions (1918); 4 light horse squadrons (1916–18)
- Engagements: World War I: Western Front; Sinai and Palestine

The Australian Machine Gun Corps was a corps of the Australian Army which was formed for service during World War I. It was established in early 1916 as part of a reorganisation of the Australian Imperial Force (AIF) in Egypt as preparations were made to transfer the bulk of the AIF's infantry divisions to Europe to participate in the Western Front fighting. Initially, the corps was established into company or squadron sized elements, with a total of 20 companies being raised for service in Europe and four squadrons for service with the Australian Light Horse in the Middle East. In early 1918, the companies deployed to the Western Front were reorganised into five battalions, which were each assigned to an infantry division for defensive and offensive duties. These units were disbanded in mid-1919 following the end of hostilities.

== History ==
The corps was formed in early 1916 following a reorganisation of the Australian Imperial Force (AIF) in Egypt, in the wake of the failed Gallipoli Campaign. The AIF was doubled as part of preparations to transfer the infantry elements to the Western Front. At this time, the line infantry units were required to detach their machine gun sections to be grouped together into machine gun companies, which were then assigned at brigade level, with each company being equipped with 16 Vickers machine guns. These men were subsequently transferred from the infantry to the machine gun corps. In implementing this restructure, the Australian Army mirrored similar changes that were occurring in the British Army around the same time, which had seen the establishment of the British Machine Gun Corps in October 1915.

On the Western Front, the individual companies supported their brigades through the early battles of Australia's involvement: Fromelles, Pozieres, Mouquet Farm, Bullecourt and Ypres. Throughout this time the concept evolved, and by early 1917 a fourth company was added to each infantry division, being assigned at divisional level in addition to the three companies attached to each brigade. Finally, by early 1918, five machine gun battalions – the 1st, 2nd, 3rd, 4th and 5th – were raised from the existing 20 companies (designated 1 to 15, and 21 to 25), each with four companies and a total of 64 guns, assigned to each of the five divisions deployed to the front. These fought through the German spring offensive and the Hundred Days Offensive, being used in both defensive and offensive roles, but were disbanded in 1919.

In addition to the infantry units raised for the Western Front, four squadrons of machine guns, with 12 guns each, were raised for service with the Australian Light Horse during the Sinai and Palestine Campaign. These were designated from 1 to 4 and assigned respectively to the 1st, 2nd, 3rd and 4th Light Horse Brigades. The majority of personnel were drawn from volunteers from the state of Western Australia. Three members of the corps received the Victoria Cross for their actions on the Western Front during World War I: Claud Castleton, John Dwyer, and Edgar Towner.

During the interwar years, the machine gun battalions disappeared from the Australian Army's order of battle, largely due to cost-cutting measures. The idea would be revived in the Australian Army in the late 1930s due to concerns about war breaking out in Europe, and subsequently four machine gun battalions were raised as part of the Second Australian Imperial Force – the 2/1st, 2/2nd, 2/3rd and 2/4th – for service during World War II, while several others would be formed within the Militia, either by converting motorised Light Horse units, or by raising new battalions. The 2nd AIF battalions served in the Middle East, Greece, Syria, Malaya, Singapore, New Guinea and Borneo, while the Militia units were used primarily in a garrison role in Australia and New Guinea, although they saw some action against Japanese forces around Wau and in the Finisterre Ranges in 1943–44. In the post war period, though, the Australian Army discontinued the concept of a separate machine gun corps and machine gun battalions, instead nesting the role and function within the Royal Australian Infantry Corps, and within standard infantry battalions both within the Royal Australian Regiment and the state-based Army Reserve regiments.
