= 5th Machine Gun Battalion =

Australian Army machine gun battalion

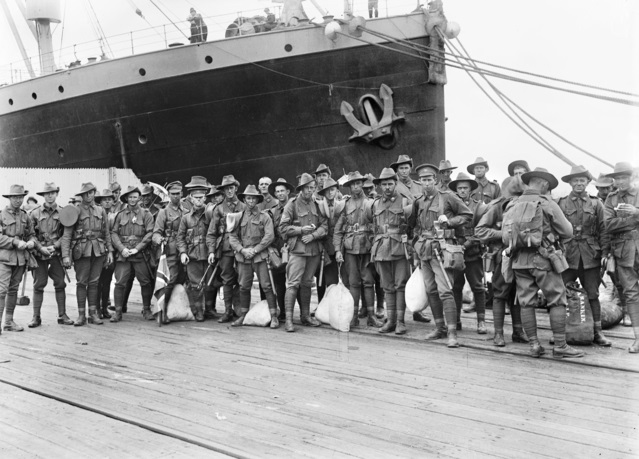
- Reinforcements for the 14th Machine Gun Company, December 1916
- Active: 1918–1919; 1942–1944
- Country: Australia
- Branch: Australian Army
- Type: Infantry
- Role: Direct and indirect fire support
- Size: ~ 900 personnel
- Part of: 5th Division; Torres Strait Force
- Engagements: World War I: German spring offensive; Hundred Days Offensive; World War II: Home front

Insignia
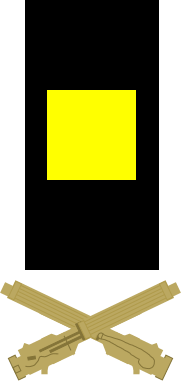
- Unit colour patch 1918–1919

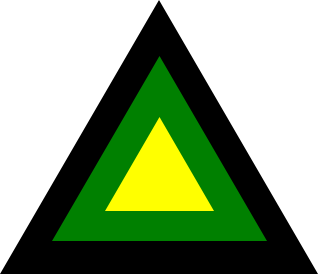
- 1942–1944

The 5th Machine Gun Battalion was an infantry support unit of the Australian Army. Originally formed in March 1918 for service during World War I as part of the all volunteer Australian Imperial Force, it was one of five such units raised as part of the AIF during the war. The battalion consisted of four machine gun companies, which had previously existed as independent companies assigned mainly at brigade level. The battalion took part in the final stages of the war, seeing action during the Allied defensive operations during the German spring offensive and then the Allied Hundred Days Offensive, which finally brought an end to the war. The battalion was disbanded in mid-1919 during the demobilisation of the AIF following the conclusion of hostilities. During World War II, the battalion was re-raised as part of the Militia in September 1942, and undertook garrison duties in the Torres Strait, until it was disbanded in May 1944.

== History ==
Originally raised for service during World War I as part of the all volunteer Australian Imperial Force (AIF), the 5th Machine Gun Battalion was one of five such units raised as part of the AIF during the war. The battalion was formed in March 1918 from Australian Machine Gun Corps personnel, and consisted of four machine gun companies – the 8th, 14th, 15th, and 25th – which had previously existed as independent companies assigned at brigade and divisional level. Major Alan Herbert Wright served as the battalion's first commanding officer, in an acting capacity until Lieutenant Colonel Thomas Roy Marsden arrived in April.

The establishment of machine gun battalions within the AIF was the final step in the evolution of the organisation of direct fire support during the war. At the start of the war, Maxim machine guns had been assigned within line infantry battalions on a limited scale of two per battalion. As it was realised that there was a need for increased fire support, this was later increased to four guns per battalion, operated by a section of one officer and 32 other ranks. At the end of the Gallipoli Campaign, the AIF was reorganised and expanded in preparation for its transfer to the Western Front, and the machine gun sections within each infantry battalion had been consolidated into companies assigned at brigade level.

The first three of the battalion's constituent companies had been formed in Egypt in March 1916 and at that time they had been assigned to the 8th, 14th and 15th Brigades respectively, arriving in Europe in mid-1916. These companies had fought through the early battles following the Australians' arrival in Europe, including Fromelles, Bullecourt, Polygon Wood and Ypres. The 25th Machine Gun Company, however, had been formed in England in February 1917 after the decision was made to assign an extra company at divisional level so that each division had four companies, and in September 1917, the company was assigned to the 5th Division, arriving in France at the end of the month.

The battalion was equipped with a total of 64 Vickers medium machine guns – assigned at a scale of 16 per company – and took part in the final stages of the war, seeing action during the Allied defensive operations during the German spring offensive and then the Allied Hundred Days Offensive, which finally brought an end to the war. During these battles, the battalion was employed to provide enfilade fire in defence, and plunging fire in support of attacking infantry forces, engaging targets out to 3,000 yards (2,700 m). Due to the exposed position from which the machine gunners fired, they suffered heavy casualties. Following the conclusion of hostilities, the battalion was disbanded in mid-1919 during the demobilisation of the AIF.

Upon formation in 1918, the battalion had adopted a vertical black and gold rectangle unit colour patch (UCP), which was usually worn above the crossed guns badge of the Machine Gun Corps. While the battalion's constituent companies had previously been issued distinctive UCPs, upon the formation of the battalion these were replaced by the single battalion patch. The black and gold colours were chosen to signify that the unit as a machine gun unit, while the vertical rectangle showed that the 5th Machine Gun Battalion was part of the 5th Division, which used the same shape UCP for the majority of its units.

== Legacy ==
In the inter-war years, the machine gun battalion concept was discontinued in the Australian Army, and in the 1920s medium machine gun platoons were added to the organisation of standard infantry battalions. According to Alexander Rodger, as a result of the decision not to re-raise machine gun battalions in the early interwar years, no battle honours were subsequently awarded to the 5th Machine Gun Battalion – or any other World War I machine gun battalion – as there was no equivalent unit to perpetuate the honours when they were promulgated by the Australian Army in 1927.

Nevertheless, the machine gun battalion concept was revived again in 1937 as fears of war in Europe surfaced again, and four Australian Light Horse regiments – the 1st, 16th, 17th and 18th – were converted into machine gun regiments. Following the outbreak of World War II, four machine gun battalions were raised as part of the Second Australian Imperial Force, each assigned at divisional level. Several more units were raised within the Militia including the 6th and 7th Machine Gun Battalions, which served in New Guinea, and several more light horse regiments were also converted for garrison duties, including the 14th, 19th, 25th and 26th.

For its part, the 5th Machine Gun Battalion was re-raised in August/September 1942 amidst the backdrop of the Japanese advance in the Pacific and fighting in New Guinea. Formed as a Militia unit at Landsborough, Queensland, it was equipped with 48 Vickers medium machine guns, and drew its personnel from the machine gun companies originally assigned to the 33rd, 45th, 46th, 52nd and 59th Infantry Battalions. When it was re-raised in 1942, the 5th Machine Gun Battalion adopted a new colour patch: a black, green and gold triangle. Defensive duties were undertaken in south-east Queensland throughout 1942, before the battalion was ordered to proceed to the Torres Strait in January 1943. There, they undertook garrison duties as part of Torres Strait Force, replacing the 62nd Infantry Battalion, which was redeployed to Merauke. The battalion remained there until July 1944, when it was relieved by the 26th Infantry Battalion and returned to mainland Australia. It was disbanded in September 1944 at Glenfield, New South Wales. At the end of that war, the decision was made to return medium machine guns to the establishment of individual infantry battalions. Consequently, since then no further machine gun battalions have been raised as part of the Australian Army.
