= Edgar Towner =

Australian soldier (1890–1972)

Edgar Towner VC MC
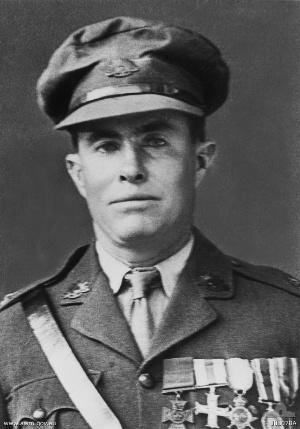
- Lieutenant Edgar Towner in c. 1920
- Born: Edgar Thomas Towner; 19 April 1890; Blackall, Colony of Queensland
- Died: 18 August 1972 (aged 82); Longreach, Queensland, Australia
- Military career
- Allegiance: Australia
- Branch: Australian Imperial Force; Citizen Military Forces
- Service years: 1915–1919; 1939–1942
- Rank: Major
- Conflicts: First World War; Western Front; Battle of the Somme; Battle of Pozières; Hundred Days Offensive; Second Battle of the Somme; Battle of Mont St Quentin; Second World War
- Awards: Victoria Cross; Military Cross; Mentioned in Despatches (2)

Edgar Thomas Towner, VC, MC (19 April 1890 – 18 August 1972) was an Australian grazier, soldier, geographer, and a recipient of the Victoria Cross, the highest decoration for gallantry "in the face of the enemy" that can be awarded to members of the British and Commonwealth armed forces. A lieutenant in the Australian Imperial Force during the First World War, Towner was awarded the Victoria Cross for his actions on 1 September 1918, during an attack on Mont St Quentin on the Western Front.

Born in Queensland to a farming family, Towner enlisted in the Australian Imperial Force in 1915. Posted to the transport section of the 25th Battalion, he served in Egypt until his unit was sent to the Western Front. He then transferred to the 2nd Machine Gun Battalion where he was commissioned as a lieutenant and twice mentioned in despatches for his leadership. In June 1918, Towner led a machine gun section in attack near Morlancourt and assisted the infantry in reaching its objectives under heavy fire, for which he was awarded the Military Cross. In September, again commanding a machine gun section, he was involved in the counteroffensive that broke the German lines at Mont St Quentin and Péronne. Fighting for thirty hours after being wounded, his "conspicuous bravery, initiative and devotion to duty" earned him the Victoria Cross, which was presented by King George V in April 1919.

Discharged in August 1919, Towner returned to farming in Queensland. He was appointed a director of the Russleigh Pastoral Company, and briefly re-enlisted for service in the Second World War, when he was promoted to major. A keen geographer, he was awarded the Dr Thomson Foundation Gold Medal in 1956 for his geographical work. Unmarried, he died in 1972 at the age of 82.

== Early life ==
Edgar Thomas Towner was born on 19 April 1890, at Glencoe Station near Blackall, Queensland, to Edgar Thomas Towner, a grazing farmer, and his Irish wife Greta (née Herley). He was educated at Blackall State School and in Rockhampton, although he also received private instruction from his mother. After leaving school Towner worked on his father's grazing property until 1912, when he acquired land of his own. He named the property "Valparaiso" and worked on its development until the outbreak of the First World War.

== First World War ==
Towner enlisted in the Australian Imperial Force on 4 January 1915. Assigned to the transport section of the 25th Battalion as a private, he embarked aboard HMAT Aeneas from Brisbane on 29 June, bound for Egypt. The troopship arrived in August, and the battalion spent the rest of the month training in the desert before transferring to the Gallipoli Peninsula. Towner, however, remained in Egypt with the army's transportation elements.

Following the Allied evacuation of Gallipoli, the 25th Battalion returned to Egypt in December 1915, where Towner rejoined its ranks on 10 January 1916. He was promoted to sergeant on 1 February, before departing with the battalion at Alexandria the following month to join the British Expeditionary Force on the Western Front. Disembarking at Marseille, the unit was the first Australian battalion to arrive in France.

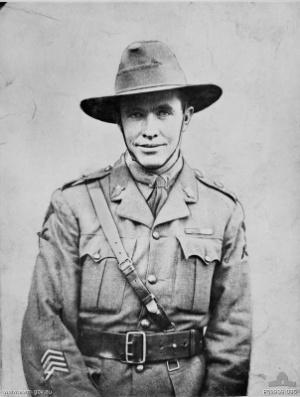
Lieutenant E. T. Towner c. 1918

In July 1916, the 25th Battalion took part in its first major Western Front action at the Battle of Pozières, part of the Somme offensive. The battalion suffered 785 casualties between 25 July and 7 August. It was briefly transferred to a "quieter sector of the front in Belgium" before returning to action on the Somme in October. On 3 November, Towner was transferred to the Australian Machine Gun Corps and was assigned to the 2nd Machine Gun Battalion of the 2nd Australian Division, and was allotted to the 7th Brigade's Machine Gun Company. He was commissioned as a second lieutenant fifteen days later, and assumed command of the battalion's transport section.

Towner was promoted to lieutenant on 24 February 1917; his service with his transport section earned him praise for his "devotion to duty and consistent good work", and on 9 April he was Mentioned in the Despatches of Field Marshal Sir Douglas Haig. Towner was granted leave to the United Kingdom in January 1918. He received a second Mention in Despatches on 7 April 1918, the notification of which was published in a supplement to The London Gazette on 28 May.

On the night of 10/11 June 1918, Towner was in command of a machine gun section during an attack to the south of Morlancourt. One of the first to reach the objective, he deployed his section and got its guns into action "very quickly". By using captured German machine guns he was able to increase his section's fire and provide support to the company on his right as it advanced, seized, and consolidated its position. During the morning of 11 June, one of the posts held by the Australian infantry was blown in by German artillery; braving machine gun and sniper fire, Towner went out in daylight to help reorganise the post. Cited for his "cheerful and untiring attitude" and for "set[ing] a conspicuous example", Towner was awarded the Military Cross for his actions. The announcement of the award and accompanying citation was published in a supplement to The London Gazette on 24 September 1918.

=== Victoria Cross ===
On 1 September 1918, Towner was in command of No. 3 Section of the 7th Machine Gun Company during an attack on Mont St Quentin, near Péronne. Armed with four Vickers machine guns, the section was attached to the right flank of the 24th Australian Infantry Battalion, whose principal objective was to seize the summit of Mont St Quentin. To accomplish this, the battalion would have to advance through the village of Feuillaucourt before moving down to the Péronne road. The Australians began their advance at 06:00 behind an artillery screen, with Towner's section covering a front of 1,400 metres (1,500 yd). Visibility was limited by rain, and Australian casualties soon began to mount. Locating a German machine gun that was causing heavy losses among the advancing troops, Towner rushed the position and single-handedly killed the crew with his revolver. Having captured the gun, he then turned it on the Germans.

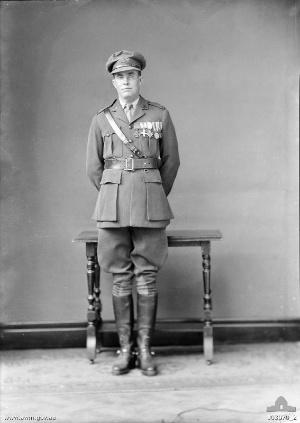
Full-length portrait of Lieutenant Edgar Towner c. 1918

Once Feuillaucourt had fallen, the 24th Battalion continued to the Péronne road. However, the Germans had occupied a copse of trees and put up strong resistance, halting the advance. German troops were observed massing for a counter-attack, so Towner moved forward with several of his men, two Vickers guns, and the captured German gun, and brought the assembling Germans under concentrated fire, inflicting many casualties. Attempting to retire, a party of twenty-five German soldiers were cut off by Towner's guns and taken prisoner. Under heavy incoming fire, Towner then scouted over open terrain to locate advantageous positions from which his guns could offer further support. When he moved his section forward, the machine gunners were able to engage more groups of German soldiers; their aggressive action enabled the advance to be renewed, and the battalion attained the cover of a sunken section of the Péronne road. On rejoining them Towner found that his section was growing short of ammunition, so he made his way back across the fire-swept ground and located a German machine gun, which he brought forward along with several boxes of ammunition. This he brought into action "in full view of the enemy"; his effective fire forced the Germans to retire further, and allowed one of the stalled Australian flanks to push ahead.

German machine gunners had occupied a commanding vantage overlooking the sunken road, and began to rain down heavy fire around Towner's position. One of the bullets struck his helmet, inflicting a gaping wound to his scalp. Refusing to be evacuated for medical treatment, Towner continued firing his gun as the German pressure increased and the situation grew critical. Eventually the Australian infantry were forced to retire a short distance, but with all its crew having become casualties, one gun was left behind. Alone, Towner dashed out over no man's land and retrieved the weapon. With this gun he "continued to engage the enemy whenever they appeared", putting a German machine gun out of action with his accurate fire.

Throughout the night, Towner frequented the front lines and "continued to fight and ... inspire his men". He provided supporting fire for the 21st Australian Infantry Battalion as it assaulted a heavily fortified crater on Mont St Quentin's summit, and repeatedly reconnoitred the German position to report on troop movements. The next morning his section assisted in repulsing a large German counterattack before Towner was evacuated with exhaustion, thirty hours after being wounded. Initially admitted to the 41st Casualty Clearing Station, he was transported by train to the 2nd Red Cross Hospital at Rouen. For his actions during the battle, Towner was awarded the Victoria Cross—the third of six Australians to receive the medal during the fighting around Mont St Quentin and Péronne.

The full citation for Towner's Victoria Cross appeared in a supplement to The London Gazette on 14 December 1918, reading:

War Officer, 14th December, 1918.

His Majesty the KING has been graciously pleased to approve of the award of the Victoria Cross to the undermentioned Officers, Warrant Officer, Non-commissioned Officers and Men: —

Lt. Edgar Thomas Towner, M.C., 2nd Bn., Aus. M.G. Corps.

For most conspicuous bravery, initiative and devotion to duty on 1st September, 1918, in the attack on Mont St. Quentin, near Peronne, when in charge of four Vickers guns. During the early stages of the advance he located and captured, single-handed, an enemy machine-gun which was causing casualties, and by turning it on the enemy inflicted severe losses.

Subsequently, by the skilful, tactical handling of his guns, he cut off and captured twenty-five of the enemy.

Later, by fearless reconnaissance under heavy fire, and by the energy, foresight and promptitude with which he brought fire to bear on various enemy groups, he gave valuable support to the infantry advance.

Again, when short of ammunition, he secured an enemy machine-gun, which he mounted and fired in full view of the enemy, causing the enemy to retire further, and enabling our infantry to advance. Under intense fire, although wounded, he maintained the fire of this gun at a very critical period.

During the following night he steadied and gave valuable support to a small detached post, and by his coolness and cheerfulness inspirited the men in a great degree.

Throughout the night he kept close watch by personal reconnaissance on the enemy movements, and was evacuated exhausted thirty hours after being wounded.

The valour and resourcefulness of Lt. Towner undoubtedly saved a very critical situation, and contributed largely to the success of the attack.

=== Later war service ===
Following his recuperation, Towner was granted three weeks' leave to England from 14 September 1918. He rejoined his unit on 12 October and, for six days, was attached to the School of Instruction. Following thirteen days' leave in France during late November, he returned again to the 2nd Machine Gun Battalion on 12 December.

On 10 April 1919, Towner attended an investiture ceremony in the ballroom of Buckingham Palace, during which he was decorated with his Victoria Cross and Military Cross by King George V. Three weeks later he boarded HT Karagola, bound for Australia. Disembarking at Sydney on 14 June 1919 he made his way to Brisbane, and was discharged from the Australian Imperial Force on 16 August 1919.

== Later life ==
Towner resettled on his property, but was forced to sell Valparaiso in 1922 after he was unable to raise sufficient funds to purchase livestock. He spent the next three years working as a jackaroo, until he entered into a partnership on Kaloola station, a property located near Longreach, in 1925. Towner eventually bought out his partner and assumed another partnership with the Russleigh Pastoral Company, Isisford. He was later appointed a director of the company.

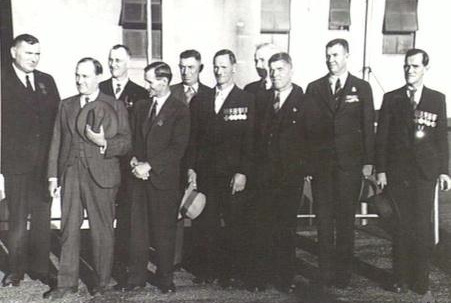
A group of Victoria Cross recipients gathered to march in the 1938 Sydney Anzac Day march. Towner is second from right.

With the Second World War looming, Towner enlisted in the Citizen Military Forces on 8 August 1939 and was appointed a captain to the 26th Battalion. After a period as a company commander, he was promoted to temporary major and second-in-command of the battalion, under fellow Victoria Cross recipient Lieutenant Colonel Harry Murray. However, Towner retired from the army due to ill health on 21 February 1942 and returned to his property at Kaloola.

A keen geographer, Towner would often disappear into the bush for weeks on end, for study or exploration. As a fellow of the Royal Geographical Society of Australia and member of the Royal Historical Society of New South Wales, he took a particular interest in researching the life of the explorer Sir Thomas Mitchell. In 1946, he successfully lobbied the Australian Government to issue a postage stamp commemorating the centenary of Mitchell's discoveries in central Queensland. He addressed the Royal Geographical Society of Australasia in Brisbane in 1955, and was awarded the Dr Thomson Foundation Gold Medal for his geographical work the following year. Towner's address was published in 1957, in a booklet entitled Lake Eyre and its Tributaries.

Towner never married, and on 18 August 1972 died at Longreach Base Hospital at the age of 82. His funeral took place three days later, with a large number of Longreach citizens lining the streets to see his coffin pass by atop a gun carriage. Following a service at St Andrew's Church, he was buried with full military honours at the Longreach Town Cemetery. By the time of his death, Towner had amassed an 80,000-acre (320 km^{2}) farm containing 25,000 sheep. He remains the most highly decorated serviceman from Queensland. On 24 April 2009, a statue of Towner crafted by Melbourne sculptor William Eicholtz was unveiled in his birth town of Blackall. Inspired by an essay written by a local schoolboy, the community raised A$80,000 to commission a monument in Towner's memory.
