= 46th Battalion (Australia) =

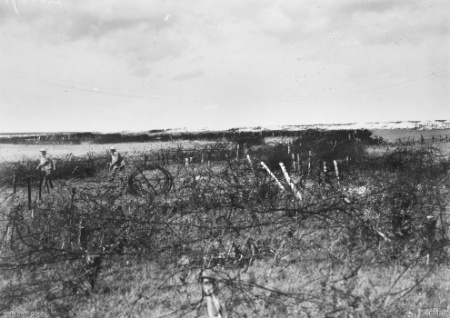
- On 18/19 September 1918, men from the 46th Battalion penetrated the wire defences of the Hindenburg Line near Bellenglise.
- Active: 1916–1919; 1921–1942
- Country: Australia
- Branch: Australian Army
- Type: Infantry
- Size: ~900–1,000 men (Note: During the First World War, the authorised strength of an Australian infantry battalion was 1,023 men. By the start of the Second World War, it was 910 men all ranks.)
- Part of: 12th Brigade, 4th Division (1916–19); 4th Brigade (1921–42)
- Nickname: Brighton Rifles
- Colours: Yellow over blue
- Engagements: First World War: Western Front; Second World War

Insignia
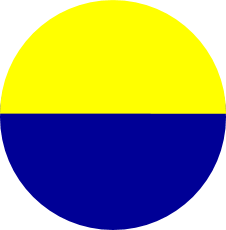
- Unit colour patch

The 46th Battalion was an infantry battalion of the Australian Army. Originally raised in 1916 for service during the First World War, the battalion served on the Western Front before being disbanded in 1919. It was re-raised as a part-time unit of the Citizens Forces in 1921 and in 1927 adopted the title of the "Brighton Rifles", before becoming part of the Militia in 1929. During the Second World War the 46th served in a garrison role before being amalgamated with the 29th Battalion in August 1942 to form the 29th/46th Battalion.

== History ==
=== First World War ===
The 46th Battalion was originally formed on 24 February 1916, during the First World War, as part of the expansion of the Australian Imperial Force (AIF) which occurred in Egypt at the conclusion of the Gallipoli Campaign. The battalion drew most of its experienced personnel from the 14th Battalion, a Victorian unit that had served at Gallipoli in 1915, while new recruits came mainly from the states of New South Wales and Western Australia. Assigned to the 12th Brigade, which formed part of the 4th Division, on 2 June 1916, the battalion received orders to proceed to France where for the next two and a half years it took part in the fighting along the Western Front.

The battalion's first major battle came at Pozières in August, initially carrying ammunition for the troops of the 2nd Division when they attacked, before later undertaking defensive duties to hold the gains that were made. After a period of rotating through the line throughout the winter of 1916–17, the 46th was committed to the First Battle of Bullecourt in early 1917. It was at Bullecourt, on 11 April 1917, that the battalion suffered its worst losses of the war. As part of the pursuit of the Germans once they had withdrawn to the Hindenburg Line, the attack was initially successful as the 46th managed to break through to its objective, but it was eventually pushed back as a result of its heavy casualties. The remainder of 1917 was spent in Belgium, where the 46th fought two more major actions at Messines and Passchendaele. In early 1918, it was transferred south to France where it played a defensive role during the German spring offensive, seeing action around Dernancourt in April. Later in the year, it took part in the final Allied offensive that began around Amiens in August 1918. Its final attack of the war was made in mid-September 1918 against the outposts of the Hindenburg Line, after which the battalion was withdrawn from the front for reorganisation and training; it was joined by the rest of the Australian Corps in early October. They remained out of the line until the armistice came into effect on 11 November 1918. Following the end of hostilities, the battalion was disbanded in April 1919.

During its service throughout the war, the battalion lost 590 men killed and 1,939 wounded. Members of the battalion received the following decorations: four Distinguished Service Orders with one Bar, one Officer of the Order of the British Empire, 28 Military Crosses with one Bar, 14 Distinguished Conduct Medals, 140 Military Medals with seven Bars, six Meritorious Service Medals, 37 Mentions in Despatches and five foreign awards. A total of 16 battle honours were awarded to the 46th Battalion for its involvement in the war; these were bestowed in 1927.

=== Inter-war years ===
In 1921, the Australian government decided to perpetuate the battle honours and traditions of the AIF by reorganising the part-time units of the Citizens Forces to adopt the numerical designations and formations of the AIF. As a result, in May 1921 the 46th Battalion was re-raised in Victoria and attached to the 4th Brigade, within the 3rd Military District. Upon formation, the battalion drew personnel from the 2nd Battalion, 46th Infantry Regiment and parts of the 14th Infantry and 29th Light Horse Regiments. In 1927, territorial designations were adopted and the battalion took on the designation of the "Brighton Rifles" due to its association with Brighton, Victoria. Its motto – Prorsum Simulque – was approved the same year, although it was changed in 1937 to Delectat mor Patria.

Initially, the strength of Australia's part-time units was maintained by a mixture of voluntary and compulsory service, but in 1929, the compulsory training scheme was suspended by the Scullin Labor government, and a voluntary system introduced in its place. In order to break with the previous system, the decision was made to adopt the name of the "Militia" in order to emphasise the voluntary nature of service. These changes, along with the economic downturn of the Great Depression which limited training opportunities, greatly affected the availability of manpower at the time and as a result a number of units were amalgamated at this time, although the 46th Battalion was not one of those selected for this fate and it remained on the order of battle, albeit with limited personnel, until the outbreak of the Second World War. During the inter-war period, the battalion formed alliances with the Duke of Cornwall's Light Infantry, the Rand Light Infantry and the Battleford Light Infantry.

=== Second World War ===
Following the commencement of hostilities, the Australian government announced that it would raise an all volunteer force, known as the Second Australian Imperial Force, for service overseas because the provisions of the Defence Act (1903) prohibited sending the units of the Militia outside of Australian territory to fight. The Militia was to provide the base upon which this force would be raised, while at the same time improve the nation's overall preparedness for war by undertaking defensive duties at strategic locations around Australia and providing training to conscripts following the re-commencement of the compulsory training scheme in early 1940.

Following this, the 46th Battalion undertook a number of training camps as the Militia were called up for periods of continuous training throughout 1940 and 1941. Following Japan's entry into the war in December 1941, however, the tempo was increased and in March 1942 the battalion was moved to Queensland along with the rest of the 4th Brigade to conduct garrison duties. In mid-1942, however, amid concerns about the ability of the Australian economy to continue to meet the demands being placed upon it by the war effort, the decision was made by the government to reduce the size of the Australian military forces and return manpower to industry by disbanding or amalgamating a number of Militia units. The 46th Battalion was one of those units chosen to be amalgamated and, as a result, in August 1942, the 46th Battalion was amalgamated with the 29th Battalion to form the 29th/46th Battalion. The 29th/46th would later go on to serve in New Guinea during the Huon Peninsula campaign in 1943–44 and then the New Britain campaign in 1945, before being disbanded in 1946. After the war, although the 46th Battalion was not re-raised, in 1961 the 46th Battalion was awarded three battle honours, which it bore for the 29th/46th Battalion.

== Battle honours ==
The 46th received the following battle honours:

- First World War: Somme 1916–18, Pozières, Bullecourt, Messines 1917, Ypres 1917, Menin Road, Polygon Wood, Passchendaele, Ancre 1918, Hamel, Amiens, Albert 1918, Hindenburg Line, Hindenburg Line, Épehy, France and Flanders 1916–18, Egypt 1915–16.
- Second World War: South West Pacific 1943–45, Liberation of Australian New Guinea, and Gusika–Fortification Point.

== Notes ==
Footnotes

Citations
