= 22nd Battalion (Australia) =

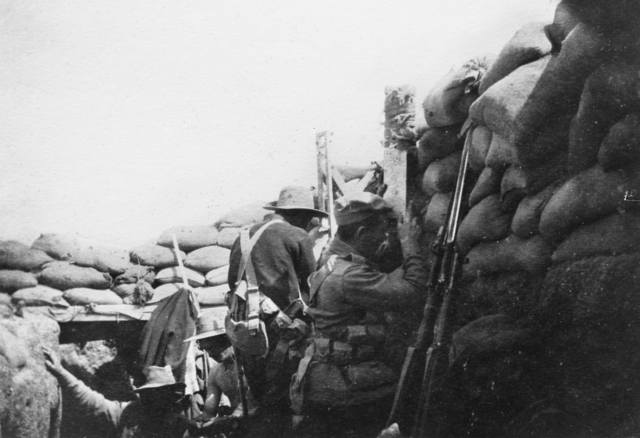
- Soldiers from the 22nd Battalion during fighting near Lone Pine, 1915.
- Active: 1915–1919; 1921–1946; 1966–1974
- Country: Australia
- Branch: Australian Army
- Type: Infantry
- Part of: 6th Brigade, 2nd Division; 4th Brigade, 5th Division
- Engagements: World War I: Gallipoli campaign; Western Front (World War I); World War II: Huon Peninsula campaign; New Britain campaign

Insignia
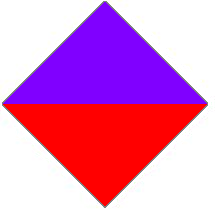
- Unit colour patch

The 22nd Battalion was an infantry battalion of the Australian Army. It was raised in 1915 as part of the Australian Imperial Force for service during World War I and formed part of the 6th Brigade, attached to the 2nd Division. It fought during the Gallipoli campaign and on the Western Front before being disbanded in 1919. In 1921, it was re-raised as a part-time unit and was merged with the 29th Battalion in 1930 to form the "29th/22nd Infantry Battalion". Split in August 1939 and known as the "22nd Battalion (South Gippsland Regiment)", the battalion saw action against the Japanese during World War II in the Huon Peninsula and New Britain campaigns. The battalion was disbanded in June 1946. It was re-established as part of the Royal Victoria Regiment in the mid-1960s as a remote area battalion within the Citizens Military Force, and later became a part of the 8th/7th Battalion, Royal Victoria Regiment.

== History ==
=== World War I ===
The 22nd Battalion was raised at Broadmeadows Camp in Victoria, on 26 March 1915, as part of the Australian Imperial Force (AIF), the all-volunteer force raised for service during World War I. The battalion was assigned to the 6th Brigade, which formed part of the 2nd Division. After completing rudimentary training, the main part of the battalion left Australia on 8 May 1915, sailing for Egypt where they were to complete their training. In September 1915, the 2nd Division was despatched to the Gallipoli Peninsula as reinforcements, and after this the battalion saw their first action after relieving elements of the 2nd Brigade holding positions north of Anzac Cove, allowing them to be withdrawn for rest. The 22nd remained at Gallipoli until the final evacuation took place in December 1915, primarily undertaking defensive duties.

During their involvement in the campaign, the battalion's transport drivers were reposted to Salonika to provide support for the Serbian contingent, along with drivers from other units within the 6th Brigade. They returned to the battalion after the final evacuation of Gallipoli. After being withdrawn back to Egypt, the battalion was strengthened by reinforcements from Australia as the AIF's infantry divisions were reorganised and expanded before being sent to France to take part in the fighting on the Western Front.

William Ruthven, the 22nd Battalion's sole Victoria Cross recipient

Embarking in March 1916, after landing in France the 22nd Battalion entered the front line around Fleurbaix in April. Its first major action came a few months later during the Battle of Pozières, which was part of the wider Battle of the Somme. The battle proved a very costly introduction to the Western Front for the 22nd Battalion, with their losses between 25 July and 7 August 1916 totalling 27 officers and 656 other ranks killed or wounded. After this, the battalion spent the next two-and-a-half years rotating through the trenches in France and Belgium.

In early 1917, the Germans withdrew to the Hindenburg Line, after which the 22nd Battalion took part in a number of actions including the Battle of Bullecourt and the Battle of Broodseinde. In early 1918, the Germans launched a large-scale offensive – the Spring Offensive – following the collapse of Russia on the Eastern Front. Throughout March and April, the 22nd Battalion undertook defensive duties as the German offensive was blunted, before the Allies launched their own offensive around Amiens in August. After this, the 22nd Battalion took part in a number of battles including the Battle of Mont St Quentin and the Battle of Montbrehain. The fighting around Montbrehain, which took place on 5 October 1918, was the final action fought by Australian infantrymen on the Western Front during the war, and came as part of a series of attacks made by the Allies to breach the Hindenburg Line following the launch of the Hundred Days Offensive. Following the successful attack, the 22nd Battalion moved to Abbeville where, along with the rest of the Australian Corps, they were withdrawn for rest and reorganisation due to heavy casualties.

In November 1918, an armistice came into effect, ending the war before the battalion could return to the front. After this, the AIF was slowly returned to Australia and the battalion's personnel were demobilised. By May 1919, the battalion ceased to exist. During the war, one member of the battalion received the Victoria Cross: Sergeant William Ruthven, who received the award for his actions during an attack on Ville-sur-Ancre on 19 May 1918. According to the Australian War Memorial, the 22nd Battalion's casualties during the war amounted to 854 killed and 2,378 wounded.

=== Inter-war years, World War II and beyond ===
In 1921, after the demobilisation of the AIF was completed, Australia's part-time military forces – the Citizens Forces – was reorganised to perpetuate the numerical designations of the AIF. As a result, the 22nd Battalion was re-raised from previously existing Citizens Forces units, drawing personnel and lineage from the 2nd Battalion, 22nd Infantry Regiment as well as elements of the 6th and 29th Infantry Regiments and the 29th Light Horse. In 1927, the battalion adopted the territorial designation of the "Richmond Regiment", and the motto of Extendere Factis. In 1930, an alliance was approved with The Cheshire Regiment. That same year, the 22nd was merged with the 29th Battalion to form the 29th/22nd Infantry Battalion, because of reduced manpower and government funding as a result of the Great Depression. The two units were split in August 1939 as the Australian military was expanded just prior to the outbreak of World War II. At this time, the battalion became known as the "22nd Battalion (South Gippsland Regiment)", as it was re-established around Leongatha in South Gippsland, Victoria.

Early in the war, the 22nd was assigned to the 4th Brigade and undertook garrison duties and training camps in Australia – based mainly in Queensland. In early 1943, the battalion was deployed to New Guinea to take part in the fighting against the Japanese serving mainly with the 5th Division, but also briefly as part of the 9th. The battalion initially deployed to the Milne Bay area in March 1943 undertaking garrison duties and jungle training before moving to Lae shortly after its capture by Australian forces in early September. Later in the month, the 9th Division carried out a landing on the Huon Peninsula, and the 22nd Battalion played a support role, advancing towards Finschhafen overland from Lae, while the 9th Division advanced on the town from the north from their lodgement at Scarlet Beach. In order to relieve the 2/13th and 2/15th Infantry Battalions around the beachhead to free them up for the advance west on Lae, the 4th Brigade had landed to the east of Lae on 10/11 September. The 22nd had then began the pursuit of the Japanese that were withdrawing to the east, marching from Hopoi Mission Station to Finschhafen, with a view to placing pressure on the Japanese southern flank. This feat was described by the Kalgoorlie Miner as the "greatest march" of the New Guinea campaign and in 10 days the battalion covered 50 miles (80 km) of rugged terrain. Later, after Sattelberg was captured, they joined the advance along the northern coast of the Huon Peninsula towards Madang.

After a total of 16 months overseas, the battalion was withdrawn back to Australia for rest and reorganisation in September 1944. After a period of training around Strathpine, Queensland, the 22nd Battalion was deployed to New Britain in January 1945. After landing at Wunung Bay, the 22nd Battalion undertook patrols around the local area as the Australians undertook a campaign to contain the larger Japanese force to the northern part of the island. The fighting came to an end in August 1945 and after the war, the 22nd Battalion garrisoned Rabaul. It was disbanded on 26 May 1946. During the war, the 22nd Battalion lost 43 men killed in action or died on active service, while a further 72 were wounded.

In 1966, following the reintroduction of national service, the 22nd Battalion was re-raised as part of the Royal Victoria Regiment, as a remote area battalion within the Citizens Military Force, offering special conditions of service for those eligible for call up who elected to serve in the CMF rather than the Regular Army, but who could not meet their training requirements through normal attendance due to their occupation or place of residence. The battalion also included a small detachment of Tasmanians, who had originally been recruited into the 50th Battalion, but who were reallocated when the decision to re-raise that unit was cancelled. With the abolition of national service in late 1972, 22 RVR lost the vast majority of its soldiers. To keep the battalion viable C Company of the 2nd Battalion, Royal Victoria Regiment (2 RVR), with depots in Shepparton and Echuca, was attached to 22 RVR. 22 RVR was closed on 30 June 1975 and C Company returned to 2 RVR, which subsequently became the 8th/7th Battalion, Royal Victoria Regiment in 1987.

== Alliances ==
- United Kingdom – The Cheshire Regiment: (1930–51).

== Battle honours ==
The 22nd Battalion received the following battle honours:

- World War I: Somme, 1916, Somme 1918, Pozières, Bapaume 1917, Bullecourt, Ypres 1917, Menin Road, Polygon Wood, Broodseinde, Poelcappelle, Passchendaele, Hamel, Amiens, Albert 1918, Mont St. Quentin, Hindenburg Line, Beaurevoir, France and Flanders, 1916–18, Gallipoli 1915, and Egypt 1915–16.
- World War II: South-West Pacific 1942–1945, Liberation of Australian New Guinea, Rabaul, Kalueng River, Wareo–Lakona, Gusika–Fortification Point, and Finschhafen.

== Commanding officers ==
The following officers commanded the 22nd Battalion:

World War I

- Lieutenant Colonel Richard Armstrong Crouch
- Lieutenant Colonel Ignatius Bertram Norris
- Lieutenant Colonel Robert Smith
- Lieutenant Colonel David Manton Davis
- Lieutenant Colonel Aubrey Roy Liddon Wiltshire.

World War II

- Lieutenant Colonel Eric Barnes
- Lieutenant Colonel Herbert Ralph Birch
- Lieutenant Colonel James de Mole Carstairs
- Lieutenant Colonel Eric Clive Tait Matthewson
- Lieutenant Colonel John Christian Watson O'Connor.
