= 4th Brigade (Australia) =

Formation of the Australian Army

- Active: 1912–1919; 1921–present
- Country: Australia
- Branch: Australian Army
- Size: 200 (active); 2,100 (reserve); 40 (civilian)
- Part of: 2nd Division
- Garrison/HQ: Melbourne
- Engagements: World War I: Gallipoli campaign; Western Front; World War II: New Guinea campaign; New Britain campaign

Commanders
- Notable commanders: John Monash

Insignia
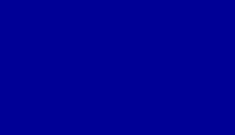
- Unit colour patch

The 4th Brigade is a brigade-level formation of the Australian Army. Originally formed in 1912 as a Militia formation, the brigade was re-raised for service during World War I, elements of the brigade served at Gallipoli and in the trenches on the Western Front before being disbanded in 1919. In 1921, the brigade was re-raised as a unit of Australia's part-time military forces, based in the state of Victoria. During World War II the brigade served in the New Guinea and New Britain campaigns. Following the war, the brigade formed part of the 3rd Division, however, it was later reallocated to the 2nd Division, where it serves as a Reserve combined-arms formation including units and personnel from all corps of the Army including armoured, infantry, artillery, engineers, signals and ordnance.

== History ==
The 4th Brigade traces its origins to 1912, when it was formed as a Militia brigade as part of the introduction of the compulsory training scheme, assigned to the 2nd Military District. At this time, the brigade's constituent units were located around regional New South Wales including Armidale, Inverell, Tamworth, Maitland, Newcastle and Adamstown.

=== World War I ===
In September 1914, the brigade was re-raised as part of the Australian Imperial Force (AIF), which was an all-volunteer force that was raised for service during World War I shortly after the outbreak of the war. Under the command of Colonel (later General Sir) John Monash, at that time the brigade consisted of four infantry battalions which were raised from all Australian states: the 13th (NSW), 14th (Vic), 15th (Qld/Tas) and 16th Battalions (SA/WA).

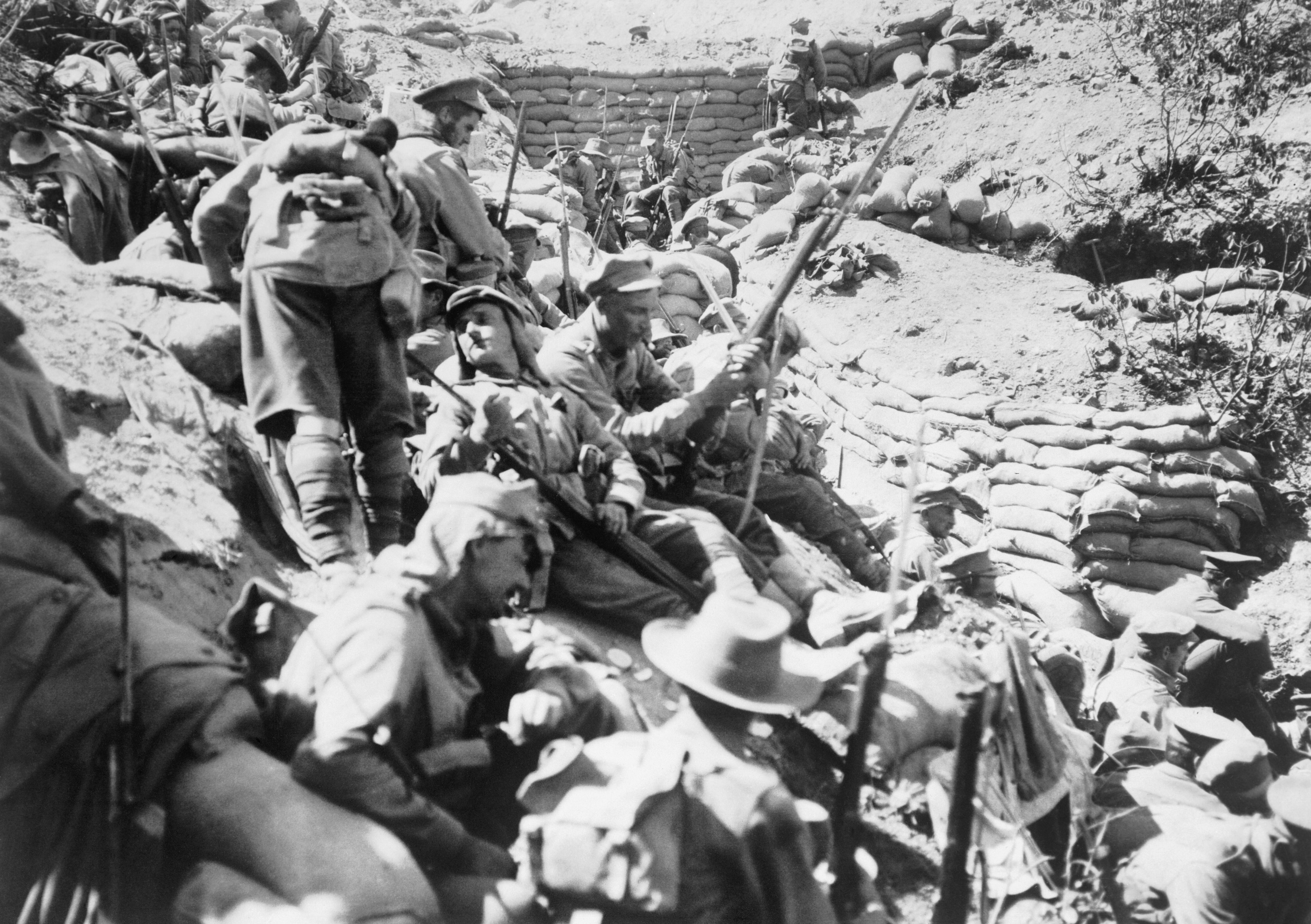
4th Brigade soldiers at Quinn's Post, May 1915

Following initial training at Broadmeadows in Victoria, they embarked for overseas in the second wave of Australian forces to be dispatched, leaving in December 1914. They arrived in Egypt in early 1915, where they were assigned to the New Zealand and Australian Division. In April 1915, the brigade participated in the ANZAC landing at Gallipoli, arriving on the second day as the division's reserve, before joining the eight-month campaign that followed. During the August Offensive, the brigade attacked Hill 971 and then, later, Hill 60. In December 1915 the decision was made to evacuate Gallipoli and subsequently the brigade was transported back to Egypt. Following this, the AIF underwent a period of reorganisation and expansion. As a part of this process, the 4th Brigade provided a cadre of experienced personnel to the newly formed 12th Brigade. At the same time, the brigade was reassigned to the 4th Division.

In June 1916, after spending a couple of months manning defences along the Suez Canal, the brigade, along with the rest of the 4th Division was transferred to Europe where they joined the war on the Western Front in France and Belgium. Assigned to the front line around Armentières, they undertook their first operation on 2 July, undertaking an unsuccessful raid. During the next two years, the brigade rotated in and out of the line along with the rest of the 4th Division. In April 1917, the brigade took part in heavy fighting around Bullecourt where, on 11 April, they suffered heavy casualties, losing 2,339 men out of the 3,000 that were committed. In April 1918, the 4th Brigade was involved in significant fighting around Villers-Bretonneux, and eventually succeeded in liberating the town. The liberation was the third anniversary of Anzac Day, 25 April 1918. In commemoration of the sacrifices made by Australians, in 1926 the main street of the town was renamed "Rue de Melbourne", while another was named "Rue de Victoria". The school, which was damaged during the fighting, was rebuilt with donations from Victorian school children and was subsequently called "Victoria School".

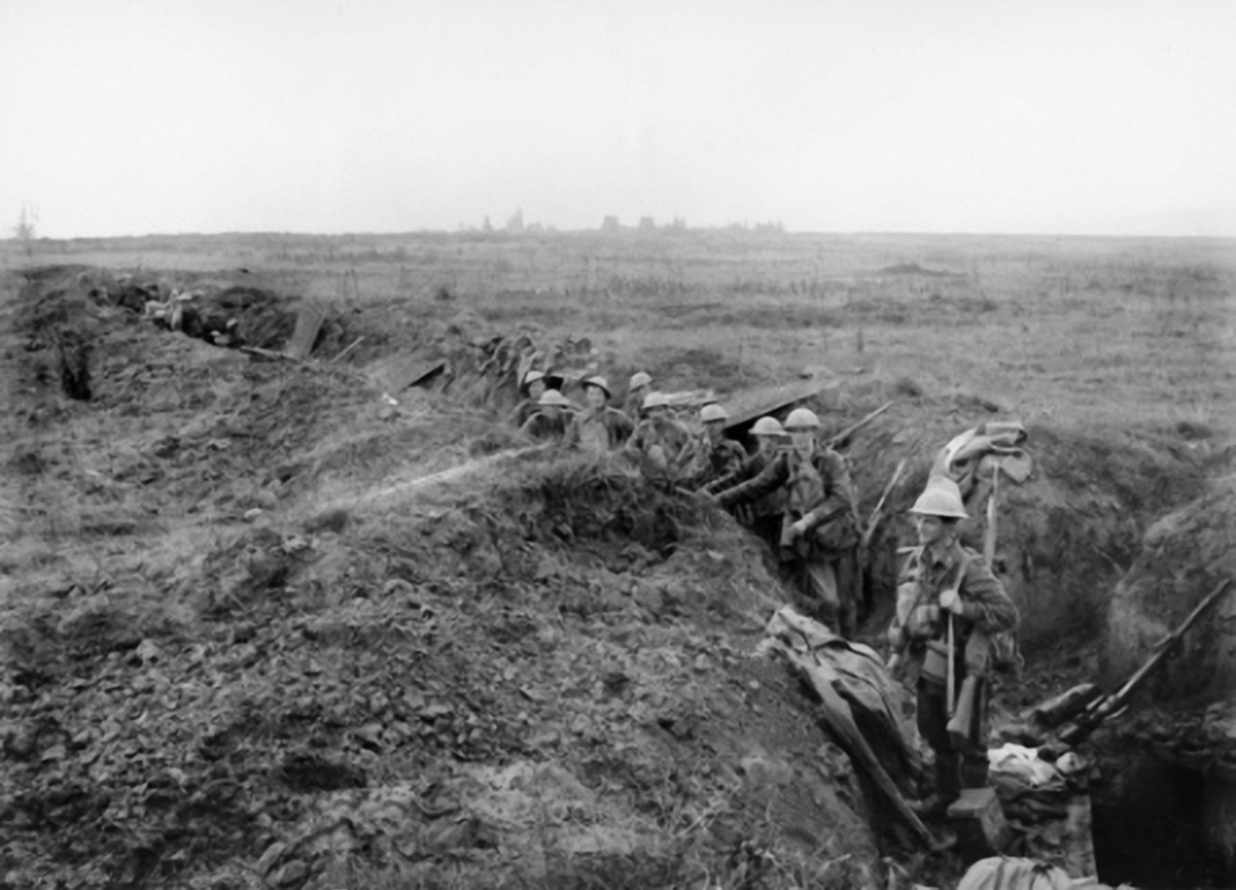
Men of the 4th Brigade at Le Verguier, France in 1918.

Later, in July, the 4th Brigade took part in the fighting around Le Hamel. The tactics used during the battle on 4 July 1918 were conceived by General John Monash and largely carried out by Australian infantrymen, along with a number of US troops. It was the scene of one of Allies greatest military victories during the war. So great was this victory that French prime minister Georges Clemenceau came to address the Australian troops in the field: "When the Australians came to France, the French people expected a great deal of you, but we did not know that from the very beginning you would astonish the whole continent". On 12 August 1918 Monash was knighted in the field by King George V.

The 4th Brigade remained in the front line until late September 1918, taking part in the Hundred Days Offensive, including the fighting on 8 August, which was later described as the "Black Day" by the German commander, Erich Ludendorff. In early October the rest of the Australian Corps was withdrawn from the line for rest and re-organisation in order to prepare for further operations. As a result, the brigade did not take part in any further fighting before the Armistice in November 1918, after which the brigade's component infantry battalions began the demobilisation process and were eventually disbanded in 1919.

During the course of the war, eight members of the brigade received the Victoria Cross. These were: Albert Jacka, Martin O'Meara, John Dwyer, Harry Murray, Henry Dalziel, Thomas Axford, Maurice Buckley and Dominic McCarthy.

=== Inter war years ===
In 1921, Australia's part-time military forces were re-organised to perpetuate the numerical designations and structure of the AIF formations that had existed during World War I. As a result, in May the 4th Brigade was re-raised as part of the Citizens Forces. Where possible the decision was made to raise the new formations in the recruiting areas from where the World War I units had drawn their personnel. Due to the fact that the 4th Brigade had consisted of battalions that had been drawn from a number of Australian states, upon re-forming when it was decided to base the brigade in Victoria—with its headquarters in Prahran—only one of its four component battalions had the numerical designation of units that had been assigned to the brigade previously. The four infantry battalions that were assigned to it at this time were: the 14th, 22nd, 29th and 46th Battalions. The brigade was assigned to the 3rd Division at this time.

Initially, despite a level of war-weariness in Australia, numbers within the Citizens Force were maintained through voluntary recruitment and the compulsory training scheme, and due to strategic concerns around the expansion of Japanese naval power within the Pacific, there was a need to maintain a strong part-time military force. As a result, each infantry battalion within the brigade was able to report being at full strength, with over 1,000 men in each of the four battalions. However, in 1922 following the conclusion of the Washington Naval Treaty, which theoretically resolved Australia's security concerns, the decision was made to reduce the Army's budget and reduce the authorised strength of each battalion to 409 men.

The manpower situation grew more acute in 1929 when the Scullin Labor government suspended the compulsory training scheme and replaced it with a voluntary "Militia". This decision, coupled with the economic downturn of the Great Depression resulted in further scarcity of recruits for the brigade's infantry battalions and, as a result, the decision was made to amalgamate two of the battalions, the 22nd and the 29th, to form the 29th/22nd Battalion. Throughout the 1930s, the situation was characterised by poor attendance and limited training opportunities. This resulted in further changes in the brigade's composition, and by 1934, the 14th Battalion had been reassigned to the 2nd Brigade. The manpower situation, however, began to improve in 1936 and then again in 1938 when tensions in Europe increased concerns about the possibility of another war. The result of this was a concerted recruitment drive and more funding for training courses and camps, which in turn resulted in more enlistments. As a result of the improved attendance within the 4th Brigade, 29th/22nd Battalion was split in August 1939 and the 22nd and 29th Battalions were reconstituted in their own right.

=== World War II ===
At the outbreak of World War II, the brigade was a part-time formation of the Militia, based in Victoria. As the provisions of the Defence Act (1903) precluded the deployment of Militia formations outside of Australian territory to fight, the Australian government decided to raise a separate force for dispatch to Europe and the Middle East. This force was known as the Second Australian Imperial Force. As a result, it was decided that the Militia would be used to improve the country's overall readiness for war through undertaking periods of continuous training, undertaking defensive duties and managing the training of recruits called up following the re-establishment of the compulsory training scheme in January 1940.

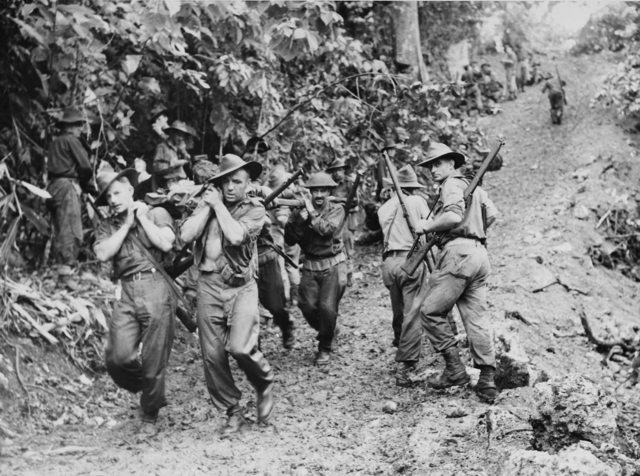
Soldiers from the 29th/46th Battalion evacuate a wounded comrade following fighting around Gusika on New Guinea, November 1943

In September 1939, the brigade consisted of three infantry battalions—the 22nd, 29th and 46th Battalions—and it was initially assigned to the 3rd Division. Following Japan's entry into the war in December 1941, however, the 4th Brigade was mobilised for war service and raised to a higher state of training at Bonegilla, Victoria. At this time the brigade was assigned a reserve response force role, and in March 1942, the brigade moved to Warwick, Queensland, and from there to Chermside to take up defensive positions around the north of Brisbane. Later in the year, the brigade was reorientated to defend the southern approaches to Brisbane. Later in the year, the brigade moved to Forest Glen, Queensland on the Sunshine Coast. In March 1943, the brigade was transferred to the 5th Division and it was deployed to New Guinea, being dispatched to Milne Bay to relieve the 7th Brigade. Later, the brigade took part in the Huon Peninsula campaign, and it was amongst the first of the Militia brigades to see action against the Japanese at Guiska. At that time, the brigade consisted of the 22nd, 29th/46th and 37th/52nd Infantry Battalions. Throughout 1943 and 1944 the brigade was transferred between the 5th and 9th Division a number of times, taking part in the New Guinea campaign.

In September 1944, the brigade returned to Australia for reorganisation and training before taking part in the New Britain campaign. Due to a shortage of shipping, the brigade's deployment was delayed and they did not land until January 1945. Following this, the brigade came under the command of the 11th Division, and helped to undertake a containment campaign against the Japanese forces on the island until the end of the war in August 1945, although only one battalion, the 37th/52nd was deployed forward to Ea Ea, while the rest remained at Wunung. Post war, the brigade assisted with occupation duties and oversaw the Japanese surrender around Rabaul.

=== Post World War II ===
In 1948, following the completion of the demobilisation process, Australia's part-time military forces were re-organised under the guise of the Citizens Military Force. Upon re-formation, the 4th Brigade was assigned to the 3rd Division and consisted of three infantry battalions: the 5th, 6th and 8th/7th. Throughout the Cold War period which followed, the composition of the brigade changed a number of times as the role of part-time military forces evolved. Initially, post war service was voluntary, however, in 1951 national service was instituted and this increased the size of the CMF units. During this time, due to increased manpower and resources, the brigade was able to achieve full manning and equipment scales and, as a result, in 1959, formed the basis of a 3,500-man combined arms exercise undertaken at Puckapunyal.

Nevertheless, the national service scheme was suspended in 1960, due to the large amount of resources required to administer it. At the same time, the introduction of the Pentropic divisional establishment saw the disbandment or amalgamation of many infantry battalions as regional-based battalions were formed into multi-battalion State-based regiments. This saw the adoption of the five battalion division and resulted in the disbandment of the old three battalion brigade formations.

In late 1964, however, the decision was made to end the experiment with the Pentropic establishment, partly because of the difficulties it created with allied interoperability. Early the following year the brigade formations were re-established, although they were designated "task forces" instead of brigades. By 1976, due to limited resources and manpower the brigade's parent formation, the 3rd Division, had become a largely hollow structure. As a result, the division's headquarters were merged with the 4th Task Force's headquarters as the 3rd Division was redesignated as the "3rd Division Field Force Group" and the 4th Task Force ceased to exist.

On 1 July 1981 the formation was re-raised as the "4th Task Force", however, in 1982 it was renamed as the "4th Brigade". In 1981 the brigade's infantry battalions were the 1st and 2nd Battalions, Royal Victoria Regiment (RVR). In December 1982 the 5th/6th Battalion was raised by establishing a new BHQ and utilising some of the 1 RVR companies. Until 1987 the brigade had three infantry battalions, 1 RVR, 2 RVR and 5/6 RVR. During this period 2 RVR was renamed 8/7 RVR. In 1987 the brigade was reduced to just two infantry battalions, namely 5/6 RVR and 8/7 RVR and supporting arms. In the early 1990s the brigade was assigned to the 2nd Division. In 1991, following a force structure review, the 3rd Division was disbanded and its units were placed under the 4th Brigade's command. As a result, in the late 1990s it had a vital asset protection mobilisation role as part of the "Protective Force" in the Tindal area of the Northern Territory.

=== 21st century ===
Monash University Regiment (MonUR) and the 2nd/10th Medium Regiment, which had previously been assigned to the brigade, were removed from the Australian Army's Order of Battle in 2012. The Officer Cadet Company of MUR was renamed Monash University Company, and the artillery was amalgamated with 5/6 RVR as the 2nd/10th Light Battery, employing mortars rather than field artillery. The 4th Combat Engineer Regiment (4 CER) was removed from the Australian Army Order of Battle in 2013. 4 CER and 22nd Construction Regiment (22 Const Regt) were amalgamated in 2013 to form the 22nd Engineer Regiment (22 ER). Melbourne University Regiment was previously assigned to the brigade, but was transferred to the 8th Brigade when it was converted into a training formation in 2017–2018.

Since 2001, the brigade has contributed personnel to deployments in Iraq, Afghanistan, East Timor and the Solomon Islands. It has also supported Australia's commitment to Rifle Company Butterworth. Within Australia, the brigade provided engineer and logistic support during the 2003 Alpine Bushfires, the 2006 Gippsland Fires, as well as support to the community during the 2009 Victorian bushfires and the 2011 floods and 2012 floods. The brigade also supported relief efforts during the 2019–20 Australian bushfire season.

Under Plan Beersheba the 4th Brigade is paired with the reserve 9th Brigade to reinforce the regular 1st Brigade. In the event of the 1st Brigade being deployed, the two reserve brigades are tasked with generating a battalion-sized battle group, designated "Battlegroup Jacka".

== Organisation ==
As of 2023 the 4th Brigade is headquartered at Simpson Barracks in Melbourne. It consists of about 2,400 personnel, who are based in a number of locations in Melbourne and regional Victoria. The brigade currently consists of the following units:

- Headquarters 4th Brigade
- 4th/19th Prince of Wales' Light Horse, Royal Australian Armoured Corps
- 5th/6th Battalion, Royal Victoria Regiment
- 8th/7th Battalion, Royal Victoria Regiment
- 12th/40th Battalion, Royal Tasmanian Regiment
- 22nd Engineer Regiment, Royal Australian Engineers
- 108th Signals Squadron
- 4th Combat Service Support Battalion
