= Torres Strait Force =

- Active: 1942–45
- Country: Australia
- Branch: Australian Army
- Part of: First Army
- Garrison/HQ: Torres Strait
- Engagements: Second World War

Insignia
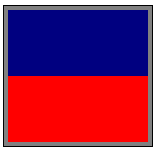
- Unit Colour Patch

Torres Strait Force was a military command unit of the Australian Army during the Second World War. Reporting directly to the First Army and consisting of infantry, artillery, anti-aircraft, engineers, medical and logistics units, it was responsible for the defence of the islands of the Torres Strait, to the north of the Australian mainland. It was formed in September 1942 under the command of Colonel H.R Langford through the redesignation of "Thursday Island Fortress". Forces assigned included the Torres Strait Light Infantry Battalion and the 5th Machine Gun Battalion.
