= 7th Machine Gun Battalion (Australia) =

Australian Army machine gun battalion

- Active: 1942–1944
- Country: Australia
- Branch: Australian Army
- Type: Infantry
- Role: Direct and indirect fire support
- Size: ~800 personnel
- Part of: 17th Brigade
- Engagements: World War II: New Guinea campaign

Insignia
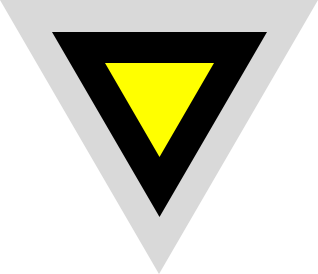
- Unit colour patch

The 7th Machine Gun Battalion was a battalion of the Australian Army that was raised for service during World War II. Formed in late 1942 from the machine gun companies of several infantry battalions, the 7th Machine Gun Battalion undertook defensive duties around Port Moresby and Milne Bay during the New Guinea campaign before taking part in the defence of Wau airfield during the Battle of Wau in early 1943. The battalion was returned to Australia in late 1943 and subsequently disbanded in mid-1944.

== History ==
A Militia unit, the battalion was raised on 2 November 1942, in Port Moresby under the designation of the "New Guinea Force Machine Gun Battalion". The following month, it was renamed as the "7th Machine Gun Battalion". Under the command of Lieutenant Colonel Terry Farrell, the battalion was formed by bringing together the machine gun companies of six infantry battalions that were already deployed in New Guinea. These were: the 3rd, 36th, 39th, 49th, 53rd and 55th.

The role of the machine gun battalion was to provide direct fire support in addition to the machine guns that were organic to infantry battalions. With an authorised strength of 700 to 800 men, like other machine gun battalions, it was equipped with 48 Vickers medium machine guns and organised into four machine gun companies. There was also several support platoons and a headquarters company. Assigned at divisional level to the 6th Division, the battalion was employed initially defend the beaches around Port Moresby against a possible Japanese landing. This lasted until January 1943, when one of its companies was transferred to Milne Bay where it joined the 11th Division and carried out patrols and other defensive tasks; other elements of the battalion were deployed forward by air to Wau, to defend the vital airfield in January and February 1943. At Wau, a company from the 7th Machine Gun Battalion was assigned to Kanga Force and the 17th Brigade. They subsequently took part in the Battle of Wau during which the battalion was reinforced by elements of the 2/1st Machine Gun Battalion. The battalion occupied several positions around Wau and Mubo and over several months took part in several actions, and suffered casualties from disease, air attacks and indirect fire.

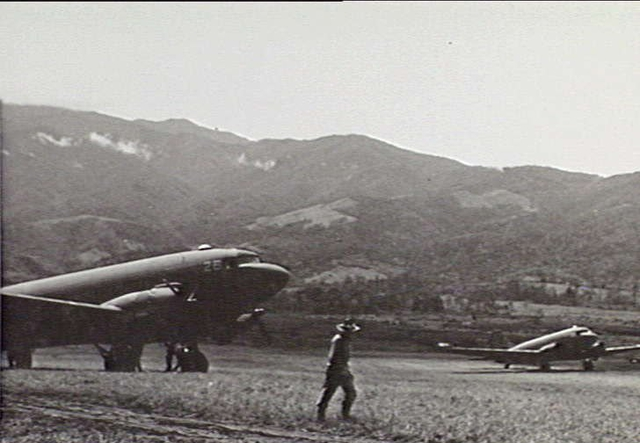
Allied aircraft at Wau airfield, where the battalion was deployed during the Battle of Wau

Meanwhile, a party was maintained in Port Moresby during this time, undertaking training, defensive duties and working to improve the defences. During this time, reinforcements were sourced from the 6th Divisional Carrier Company, and members of the Royal Australian Air Force. In July and August 1943, the Wau detachment returned to Port Moresby, and having been relieved by the 6th Machine Gun Battalion they embarked for Australia. They main body departed aboard the transport Duntroon, while the Milne Bay company returned aboard the Howell Cobb.

Training recommenced in October 1943 as the battalion began preparing for its next deployment. This included practising amphibious landings around Trinity Beach, Queensland, at the start of 1944. However, the decision was made to disband the unit, and use its personnel to reinforce other operational units, including several of the Second Australian Imperial Force machine gun battalions. Commencing in mid-March, the battalion transferred much of its vehicles and equipment and its personnel began marching out. Support troops went to docking and forestry companies, while combat troops went to units such as 2/1st, 2/2nd and 2/3rd Machine Gun Battalions, and 61st Infantry Battalion with whom they saw subsequent operational service. Some personnel were also transferred to the Royal Australian Navy. The process of disbanding the unit was completed by 1 May 1944.

== Battle honours ==
The battalion received one battle honour for its service: "South West Pacific 1943".
