= 6th Machine Gun Battalion (Australia) =

Australian Army machine gun battalion

- Active: 1942–1944
- Country: Australia
- Branch: Australian Army
- Type: Infantry
- Role: Direct and indirect fire support
- Size: ~ 800 personnel
- Part of: 7th Division
- Engagements: World War II: New Guinea campaign

Insignia
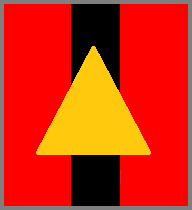
- Unit colour patch

The 6th Machine Gun Battalion was a battalion of the Australian Army that was raised for service during World War II. Formed in late 1942 from the machine gun companies of several infantry battalions, the 6th Machine Gun Battalion undertook training on the New South Wales south coast before being deployed to New Guinea where they took part in the Markham and Ramu Valley – Finisterre Range campaign, defending the airfield at Gusap, and undertaking patrols. In early 1944, the battalion returned to Australia and over the course of the year was disbanded, with its personnel being sent to other units as reinforcements. Many of these personnel then saw combat in Borneo in 1945.

== History ==
The 6th Machine Gun Battalion was raised on 22 August 1942, at Narellan, New South Wales. This was part of a reorganisation of the Militia infantry battalions, which saw them lose their integral machine gun companies, so that they could be grouped together under a single battalion headquarters. The relevant companies came from several units assigned to the 1st Division, specifically: the 1st, 13th, 17th, 18th, 20th/19th, and 34th Infantry Battalions. In addition, a small number of personnel were received from the 2nd and 41st Infantry Battalions.

Assigned at divisional level, the role of the machine gun battalion was to provide direct fire support in addition to the machine guns that were organic to infantry battalions. With an authorised strength of 700 to 800 men, the battalion was equipped with 48 Vickers medium machine guns that were spread between four main companies. These companies were supported by assorted service support soldiers including signallers, stretcher bearers, administration clerks, caterers and quartermasters. The battalion was highly mobile and included many different types of vehicles. The battalion's commanding officer on establishment was Lieutenant Colonel Anthony Hearne.

Shortly after the companies came together at Narellan, the battalion moved to Wallgrove for training. The battalion was sent to Dapto, on the New South Wales coast, in October 1942, to carry out defensive duties. The move was carried out on foot over several days. Training was completed around Wollongong and Shellharbour, New South Wales. While at Shellharbour, on 16 May 1943, the battalion took part in rescuing the crew of a US tanker, the Cities Service Boston, which sunk near Bass Point after running aground. Four personnel from the 6th Machine Gun Battalion drowned during the rescue effort. They were later commemorated in a memorial that was established in 1968 near the wreck site, and were also decorated posthumously by the United States for their efforts.

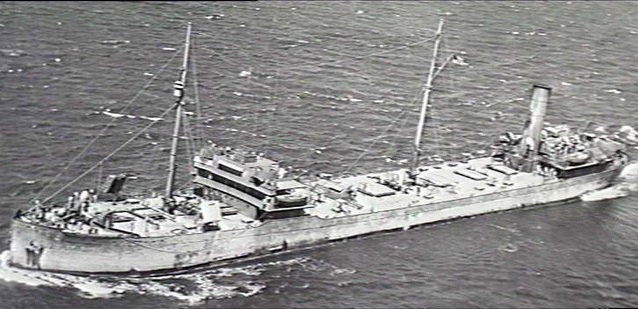
Cities Service Boston, prior to running aground off the coast of New South Wales

Several months later, the 6th Machine Gun Battalion was sent to New Guinea, where the Australians were fighting against the Japanese. Relieving the 7th Machine Gun Battalion, the battalion was attached to the 3rd Division and undertook defensive duties in Port Moresby, mainly located at Ward's Airfield, starting in July. Two months later, the battalion was sent to Donadabu, where they were attached to the 7th Infantry Brigade.

The 6th Machine Gun Battalion came under the command of the 7th Division, in October 1943, and, less one company which stayed in Port Moresby, it joined the Markham and Ramu Valley – Finisterre Range campaign. Its role during this period was to defend Gusap Airfield, amidst heavy fighting around Shaggy Ridge. Conditions around the airfield were highly malarial and the machine gunners were subjected to a number of aerial attacks. As personnel were evacuated due to illness, the Port Moresby company was used as a reinforcement pool until it was disbanded.

The battalion was relieved around Gusap in March 1944, and returned to Dobodura by air. Later, they moved to Semina where they established a camp until shipping became available for the return to Australia. The battalion subsequently returned in two contingents, both aboard the Katoomba. The main element arrived in Townsville in March, but one company was sent to Sydney. A period of leave followed, after which personnel concentrated at Wallgrove. In June 1944, the battalion began disbanding as its personnel were needed as reinforcements for other operational units. By December, the unit ceased to exist. Most of its personnel volunteered to serve overseas with the Second Australian Imperial Force and later served in Borneo in 1945 with several other infantry, pioneer and machine gun battalions, including the 2/24th Infantry Battalion, with which they saw further action on Tarakan.

== Battle honours ==
The battalion received one battle honour for its service in New Guinea: "Liberation of Australian New Guinea".
