= Australian Army unit colour patches =

Australian system of colour patches

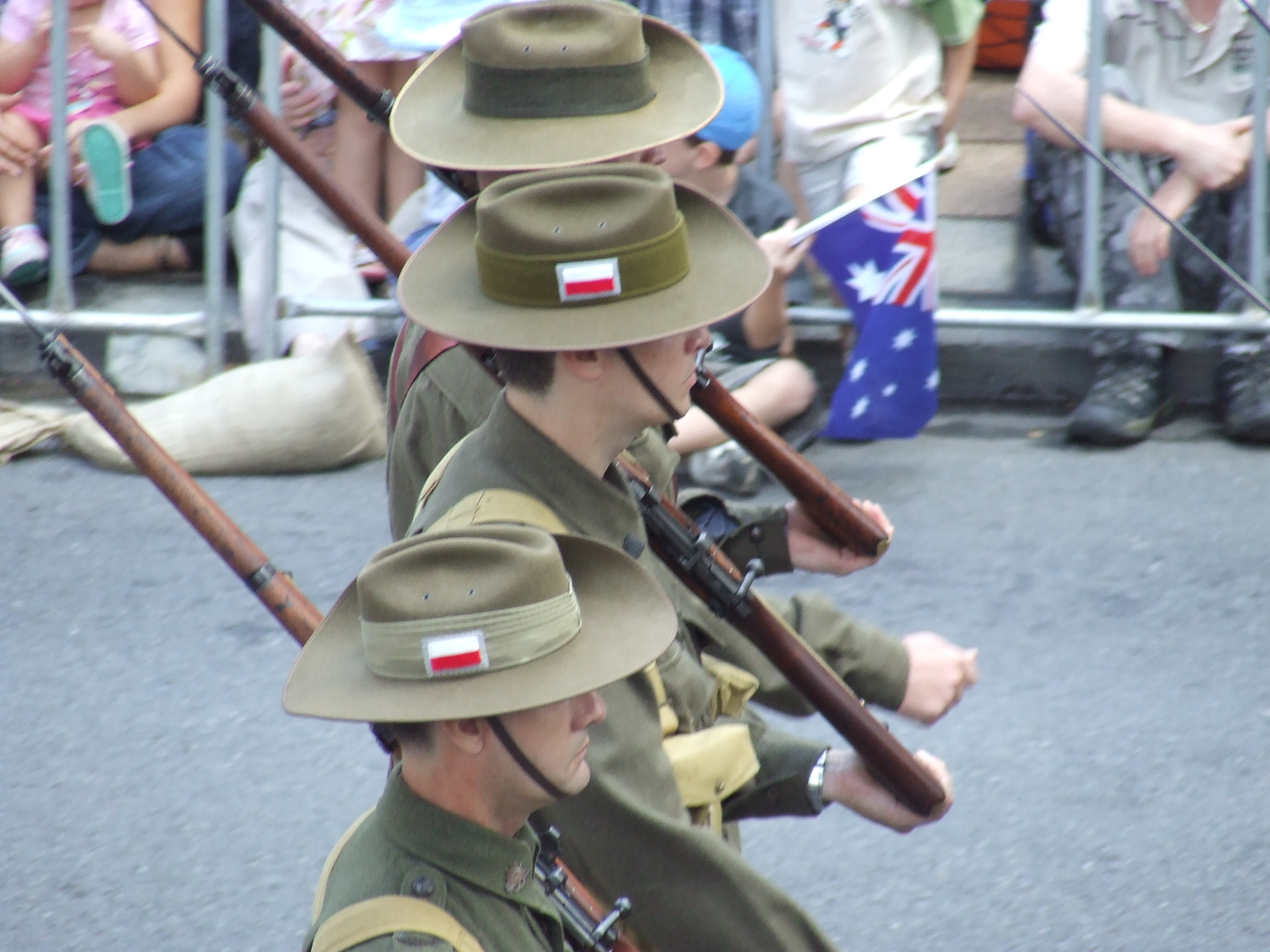
Marchers in World War II Australian uniforms, wearing the colour patch of the 2/8th Battalion. ANZAC Day Parade in Brisbane, Queensland, 25 April 2007. This colour patch was based on that of the 8th Battalion, 1st AIF, with grey trim to distinguish it as the colour patch of a unit of the 2nd AIF.

Unit colour patches (or simply known as colour patches) are a method of identification used by the Australian Army, used to indicate which unit a soldier belongs to.

It is believed that the Australian system of colour patches is based upon the small patches of colours or tartan worn on the puggarees of the pith helmets of members of a number of British Army units during the Second Boer War, the South African War of 1899–1902. While some modern Australian colour patches are recent creations, many date back to World War I.

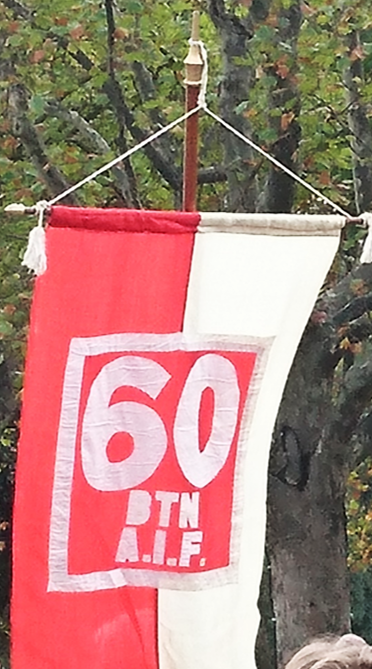
Banner representing the 60th Battalion of the 1st AIF. ANZAC Day Parade in Melbourne, Victoria, 25 April 2019. The banner design is based on the design of the 60th Battalion's unit colour patch.

The first approval for the use of distinctive unit colours for Australian army units came from Major General William Throsby Bridges for the 1st Division to fly flags to denote unit areas and lines in Egypt during World War I. C.E.W. Bean made the first reference to unit colour patches to be worn on the uniform, when he described Major General Bridges issuing 1st Australian Divisional Order No. 562 dated 8 March 1915, ordering that patches be worn, describing how they would look and ordering that they were to be worn on the uniform sleeve 1 inch (25 mm) below the shoulder. As this was an extension of the order for the posting of the colour flags to denote headquarters and unit lines, these flags were used as the basic design for 1st Division uniform colour patches.

In total over 300 individual patches were eventually authorized for Australian units during World War I.

Since World War I, many units have used colour patches showing their relationships to units of earlier times. For example, railway operating units of both the First and Second World Wars displayed a diamond (or lozenge) shape in the purple of the engineers on a red square background. Wherever possible the features of modern colour patches also reflect relationships between current units and their antecedents from previous wars. For example, modern and historical artillery patches are red and blue, modern army aviation patches preserve the light blue background with red and blue vertical bands of their World War 1 antecedents, while modern engineer patches remain predominantly purple. Some modern units reflect that they are direct descendants of World War 1 and 2 units. For example, the 8th/7th Battalion, Royal Victoria Regiment of rural Victoria uses the white over red horizontal rectangular patch of the original 8th Battalion. The shapes, colours and embellishments of unit colour patches therefore not only identify individuals as members of units, but they can also reflect the story of the unit.

In more modern times the first known example of a colour patch worn by Australian Army personnel was that of the Australian Army Fire Service (AFS). The patch was originally designed and worn by members of the Enoggera Fire Station (c. 1980) and consisted of a blue roundel ring around a red circle in the centre. The words "Army Fire Service" emblazoned in the blue roundel and an image of the Royal Australian Engineer 'bomb' insignia in front of two crossed fire axes in centre circle. The badge was worn on the right sleeve, and whilst initially unofficial, it was quickly adopted by all other units of the Australian Army Fire Service, including being used as insignia on the doors of AFS vehicles. Over time the patch was modified several times, with the image below depicting the second generation, where the blue outer edge stitching was changed to gold.

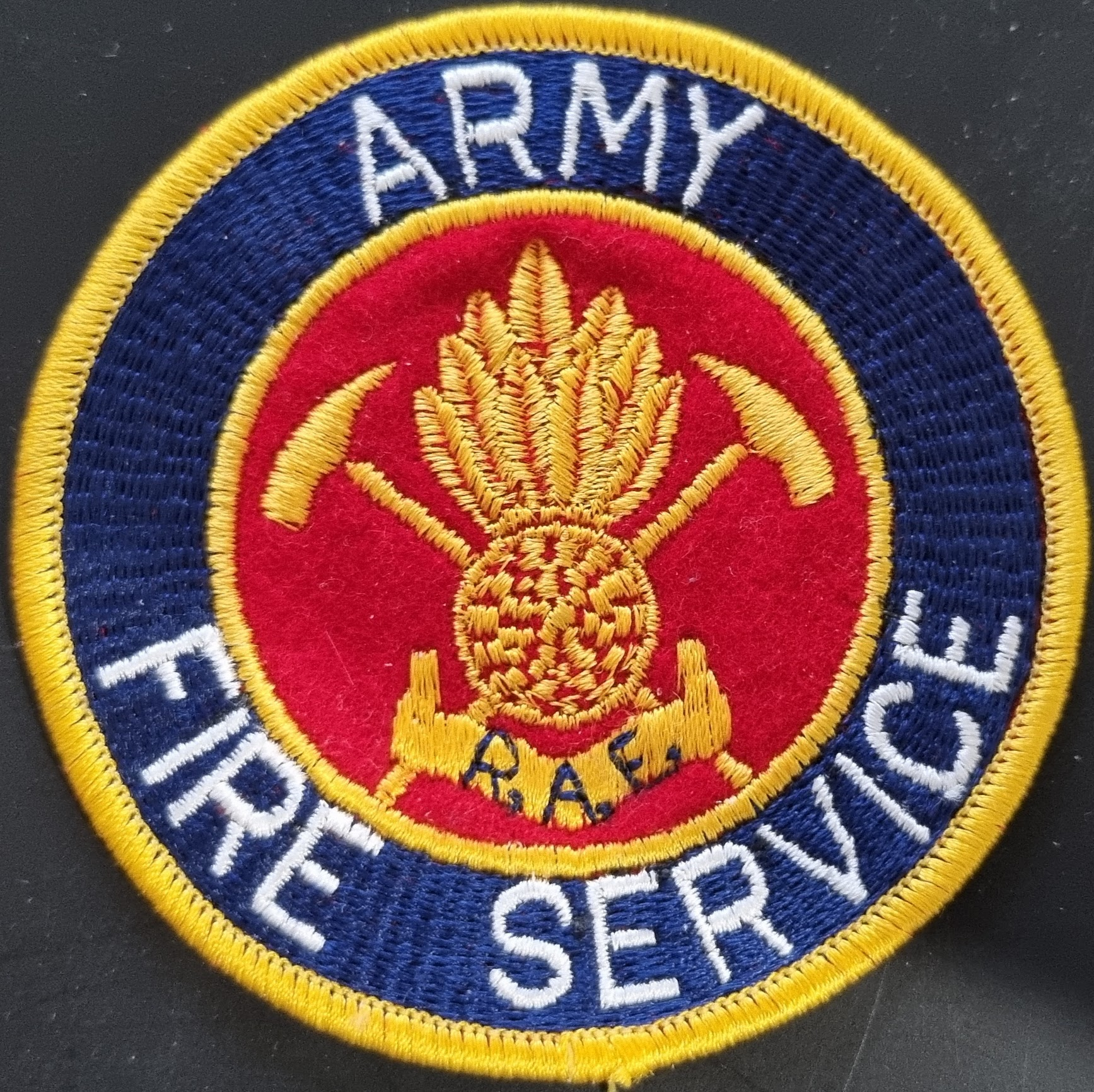
Australian Army Fire Service shoulder patch - c. 1980

Nowadays modern unit colour patches are approximately 40 millimetres (1.6 in) x 40 millimetres (1.6 in) in size and use a large variety of colours and shapes to distinguish the units they represent while preserving links to patterns used by related units from earlier times. Unit colour patches are currently worn on the right side of the puggaree on the slouch hat in the Australian Army.

== First AIF ==
The First Australian Imperial Force was involved in three major campaigns in distant lands, and a smaller campaign closer to home. The First AIF's first major battles were in the Gallipoli Campaign, followed by simultaneous involvement on the Western Front in France and Belgium and in the Middle East, particularly in the Sinai and Palestine Campaign. Meanwhile, Australian forces occupied German political possessions in New Guinea and on other islands of the Southern Pacific. All of these campaigns were distinct in character and made new demands upon the Australian military. The many challenges, losses and successes of the Australian military and its personnel helped forge the character of the new nation of Australia, which had only become the Federation of Australia on 1 January 1901. In the Gallipoli Campaign all Australian fighting units were formed up together on the Gallipoli Peninsula, with supply, medical and other services stretching back as far as Egypt and England. Subsequently, the First AIF was effectively split. For a new nation fighting a war so far from home this created many logistical and organisational challenges. There were many innovations in the organisation of the Australian military during this time. The alliance with the New Zealand Expeditionary Force and the creation of the Australian and New Zealand Army Corps and other ANZAC units were also important throughout most of World War 1.

The intent of the new unit colour patch system was initially to help with organisation and identification of individuals and units in the field. However, it became more than that, creating bonds between soldiers that contributed to the 'esprit de corps', development of loyalties and interpersonal 'mateship' among the Australians.

=== 1st Division Unit Colour Flags 1914 ===
The first orders for unit colours were for flags 9 inches (22.86 cm) square, divided horizontally with the battalion colour over the brigade colour. Green, red and light blue were allocated as the colours for the 1st Brigade, 2nd Brigade and 3rd Brigade respectively, while the colours for the battalions in each brigade in the order of battle were originally black, yellow, brown and white, the battalion colour to be shown over the brigade colour. The 4th Brigade, raised separately, was allocate blue as the brigade colour.

Glyde (1999) does not describe writing on the battalion flags (only on the Artillery, Engineers and Medical flags), but writing designating the unit may have been displayed on some or all of the other flags.

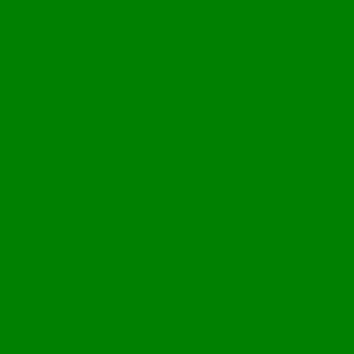
Flag of 1st Brigade Headquarters 1914

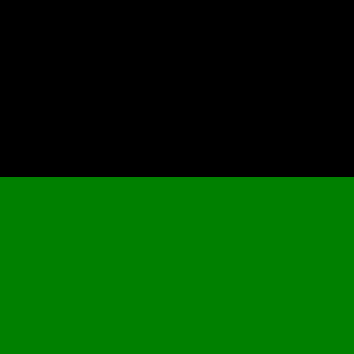
Flag of 1st Australian Infantry Battalion 1914

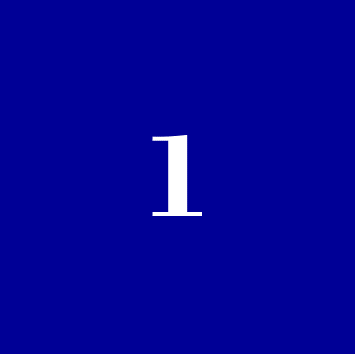
Flag of 1st Brigade Divisional Artillery

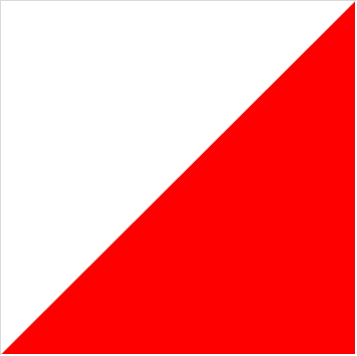
Flag of Divisional Light Horse Regiment

=== Division unit colour patches ===
Divisional Order 81 decreed a rectangular patch on the upper sleeve of the uniform 1.25 inches (32 mm) by 2.75 inches (70 mm). Engineers were ordered to change the colour of their uniform patch from khaki to purple so that it was more visible when worn against the khaki sleeve of the uniform. Artillery were ordered to adopt diagonally divided red over blue patches. As further divisions created colour patches for their uniforms, the shape of the patch indicated the division.

- 1st Division had a horizontal rectangular patch,
- 2nd Division had a diamond-shaped patch,
- 3rd Division had a horizontal oval patch,
- 4th Division had a circular patch (except the 4th Brigade, formed independently of 4th Division, which used a rectangle),
- 5th Division had a vertical rectangular patch, and
- 6th Division had vertical oval patches. The 6th Division was raised in response to a request from the British Government to the Australian Government in February 1917, but was disbanded in September of the same year to provide reinforcements to other divisions. Therefore, the 6th Division did not see active service as a formation.
- Australian Mounted Division battle units had triangular patches or horizontal rectangular patches, with the colours bisected diagonally, while some of their support units had vertical rectangular patches.
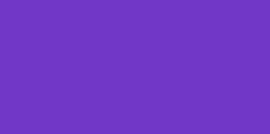
1st Australian Divisional Engineers

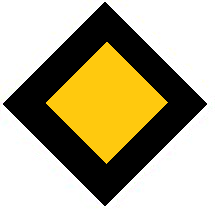
2nd Machine Gun Battalion (part of 2nd Division)

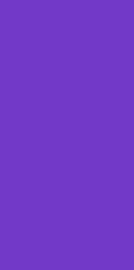
5th Australian Divisional Signal Company (Australian Engineers Signal Service) 1916–1919

=== Infantry brigades and battalions ===
Each infantry brigade within each division was assigned a colour and the brigade HQ colour patches were the divisional shape in the brigade colour. Each battalion in each brigade was then assigned a colour, and the patch was split horizontally with the battalion colour across the top of the field and the brigade colour across the bottom of the field.

On 16 March 1915 the second battalion of each infantry brigade was ordered to change their battalion colour from yellow to purple. One consequence was that it became practical for the 8th Brigade to use yellow as the brigade colour. The 14th Battalion and later the 46th Battalion retained yellow.

Light Horse, Artillery, Engineer and Medical units were also allocated colour patches. Light Trench Mortar Batteries were manned by infantrymen, and so showed the colour patches of the infantry brigades over the blue "bursting bomb", whereas medium and heavy trench mortar batteries were manned by artillery gunners and so showed the red and blue patch of their artillery brigade over the "bursting bomb". Light Horse patches were divided diagonally.

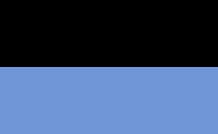
1st Division, 3rd Brigade, 9th Battalion

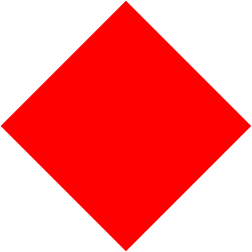
2nd Division, 6th Brigade HQ

== New Zealand Units ==
Units of the Army of the New Zealand Expeditionary Force in the First World War displayed unit colour patches worn in the centre of the back of the uniform jacket, immediately below the collar. The authority for the design and wearing of unit colour patches was from General Alexander Godley's orders dated 15 October 1917 No. 416.

In addition to these New Zealand colour patches, some New Zealanders attached to ANZAC formations in Egypt, on the Western Front and in Palestine, wore colour patches of I ANZAC Corps including the ANZAC Mounted Division, or II ANZAC Corps.

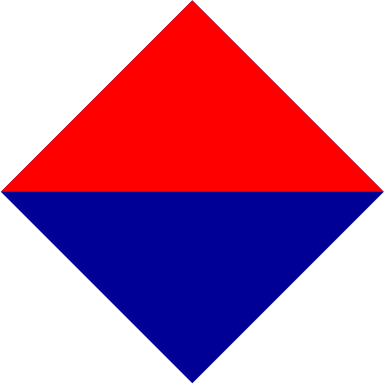
Auckland New Zealand Field Artillery

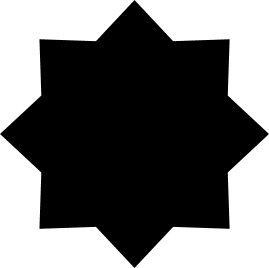
Headquarters New Zealand (Rifles) Brigade (1916)

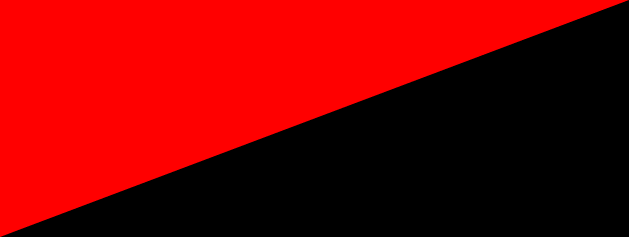
New Zealand Machine Gun Squadron

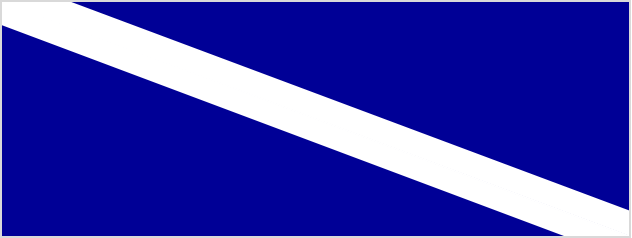
New Zealand Army Service Corps in Egypt

== See also ==
- Formation patch – Used by the British Army to describe their unit insignia
