= Structure of the Australian Army during World War I =

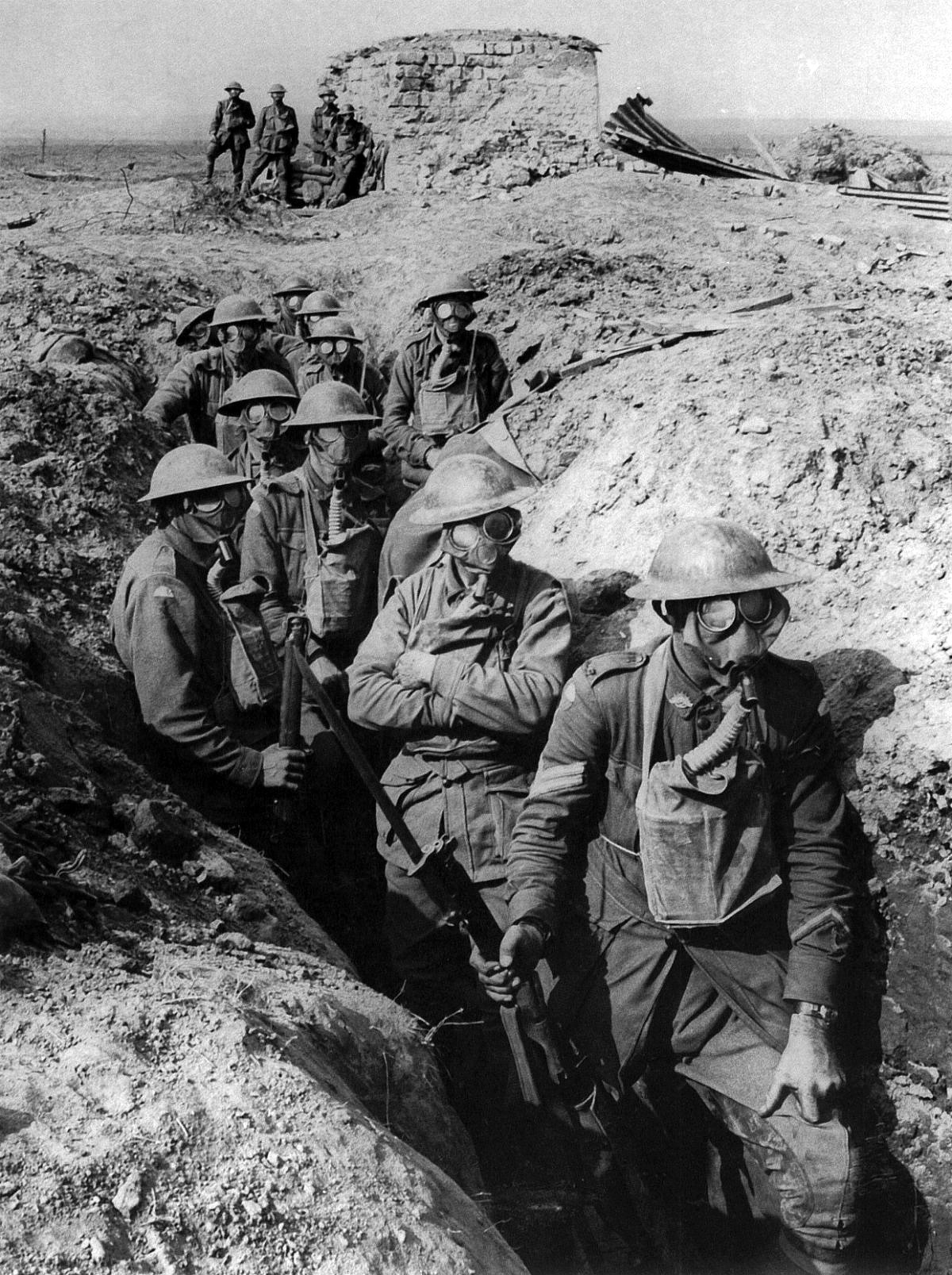
Australian infantry, Ypres 1917

The structure of the Australian Army during World War I included a small force of mostly militia which served in Australia and larger expeditionary forces which were raised for deployment overseas following the outbreak of the conflict in August 1914. The home army consisted of the small regular Permanent Forces, the part-time Citizen Forces, and the Australian Garrison Artillery, which were maintained in Australia to defend the country from attack, while expeditionary forces consisted of the Australian Naval and Military Expeditionary Force (AN&MEF) which occupied German New Guinea from September 1914, and the Australian Imperial Force (AIF) which fought at Gallipoli in 1915, and in the Middle East and on the Western Front in Europe from 1916 to 1918. Following an initial precautionary mobilisation following the outbreak of war, by the end of August 1914 those units of the reserve formations of the home army that had been activated began to stand down. From 1915, only skeleton garrisons were maintained at coastal forts. Meanwhile, as the war continued overseas the AIF sustained heavy losses, and although it expanded considerably during the war, with the voluntary recruitment system unable to replace its casualties by 1918 most of its units were significantly undermanned.

== Divisions ==
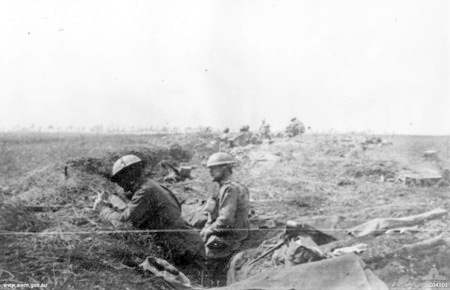
Australian infantrymen of the 3rd Division during the Battle of Amiens, 8 August 1918.

During the war, Australia raised an all volunteer force for overseas service, known as the Australian Imperial Force, which subsequently served in several theatres, including the Gallipoli Campaign, the Sinai and Palestine Campaign and on the Western Front in France and Belgium. Between the start of the war in August 1914 and its end in November 1918, Australia raised a total of seven infantry divisions, one of which – the New Zealand and Australian Division – was also manned by New Zealanders. Of these, six took part in combat, while one – the 6th – was broken up in the United Kingdom and disbanded in September 1917 before being deployed due to manpower shortages. In addition, there were two mounted divisions raised: the ANZAC Mounted Division and the Australian Mounted Division.

Designation	Date raised	Date disbanded	Campaigns	Notes
Australian 1st Division	1914	1919	Gallipoli and the Western Front	
Australian 2nd Division	1915	1919	Gallipoli and the Western Front	
Australian 3rd Division	1916	1919	Western Front	
Australian 4th Division	1916	1919	Western Front	
Australian 5th Division	1916	1919	Western Front	
Australian 6th Division	1917	1917	Broken up before being deployed	
New Zealand and Australian Division	1915	1915	Gallipoli	
ANZAC Mounted Division	1916	1919	Sinai and Palestine Campaign	
Australian Mounted Division	1917	1919	Sinai and Palestine Campaign	

== Order of battle ==
=== 1914 ===
Australian Army Order of Battle, August – October 1914

Australian Military Forces

- Military Board
  - Department of the Chief of the General Staff (Commonwealth Section, Imperial General Staff)
  - Department of the Adjutant-General
  - Department of the Quartermaster-General
  - Department of the Chief of Ordnance
  - Department of the Civil Member
  - Department of Inspector-General
  - 1st Military District – Queensland
    - 2nd Infantry Brigade (7th (Morton Regiment), 8th (Oxley), and 9th (Logan and Albert) Infantry Battalions)
    - 2nd (Kennedy Regiment), 3rd (Port Curtis), 4th (Wide Bay) and 11th (Darling Downs) Infantry Battalions (unallotted)
    - 1st Light Horse Brigade (1st (Central Queensland), 2nd (Queensland Mounted Infantry), 3rd (Darling Downs), 4th (Northern Rivers Lancers) and 27th (North Queensland) Light Horse Regiments)
    - 1st Australian Field Artillery Brigade (1st, 2nd, and 3rd)
    - No. 3 Battery, Royal Australian Field Artillery (Permanent)
    - 1st and 2nd Companies, Australian Garrison Artillery
    - Nos. 8 and 9 Companies, Royal Australian Garrison Artillery (Permanent)
    - 1st and 2nd Field Companies, Australian Engineers
    - 15th Signal Troop and 23rd Signal Company
    - 32nd Fortress Company
    - 2nd, 3rd, and 24th Companies, Australian Army Service Corps
    - 1st and 2nd Field Ambulances
    - 24th Light Horse Field Ambulance
    - 33rd Company, Australian Army Medical Corps
  - 2nd Military District – New South Wales
    - 5th Infantry Brigade (14th (Hunter River), 16th (Newcastle Regiment), 18th (North Sydney), and 19th Infantry Battalions)
    - 6th Infantry Brigade (21st (Woollahra), 24th (East Sydney Regiment), 33rd, and 34th Infantry Battalions)
    - 8th Infantry Brigade (25th, 26th, 29th (Australian Rifles), and 31st (Leichhardt) Infantry Battalions)
    - 10th Infantry Brigade (37th, 38th, 39th, 41st, and 43rd (Werriwa) Infantry Battalions)
    - Sydney University Scouts
    - 2nd Light Horse Brigade (5th (New England) and 6th (Hunter River Lancers) Light Horse Regiments)
    - 3rd Light Horse Brigade (7th (New South Wales Lancers), 9th (New South Wales Mounted Rifles), 11th (Australian Horse) and 28th (Illawarra) Light Horse Regiments)
    - 4th Australian Field Artillery Brigade (10th, 11th, and 13th Batteries)
    - 6th Australian Field Artillery Brigade (16th, 17th, 18th, and 44th Batteries)
    - No. 1 Battery, Royal Australian Field Artillery (Permanent)
    - 3rd, 4th, 5th, and 6th Companies, Australian Garrison Artillery
    - Nos. 1, 2, 3 and 4 Companies, Royal Australian Garrison Artillery (Permanent)
    - 5th, and 6th Field Companies, Australian Engineers
    - 16th and 17th Signal Troops, 24th and 25th Signal Companies
    - 33rd, 37th and 39th Fortress Companies
    - Submarine Mining and Electric Light Section, Royal Australian Engineers (Permanent)
    - Port Jackson Defences
    - 6th, 7th, 8th, 9th, 25th, and 26th Companies, Australian Army Service Corps
    - 4th, 6th, 7th, and 8th Field Ambulances
    - 25th and 26th Light Horse Field Ambulances
    - 40th Company, Australian Army Medical Corps
  - 3rd Military District – Victoria
    - 13th Infantry Brigade (46th (Brighton Rifles), 48th (Kooyong), 49th (Prahran), 51st (Albert Park), and 52nd (Hobson's Bay) Infantry Battalions)
    - 16th Infantry Brigade (55th (Collingwood), 56th (The Yarra Borderers), 63rd (The East Melbourne Regiment), and 64th (City of Melbourne Regiment) Infantry Battalions)
    - 17th Infantry Brigade (58th (Essendon Rifles), 60th (Prince's Hill), 66th (Mount Alexander), and 67th (Bendigo) Infantry Battalions)
    - 18th Infantry Brigade (70th, 71st, and 73rd (Victorian Rangers) Infantry Battalions)
    - Melbourne University Rifles
    - 5th Light Horse Brigade (13th (Gippsland), 15th (Victorian Mounted Rifles), and 16th (Indi) Light Horse Regiments)
    - 7th Light Horse Brigade (17th (Campaspe), 19th (Yarrowee), and 20th (Corangamite) and 29th (Port Phillip Horse) Light Horse Regiments)
    - 7th Australian Field Artillery Brigade (19th, 20th, and 25th Batteries)
    - 8th Australian Field Artillery Brigade (22nd, 23rd, 31st, and 46th Batteries)
    - No. 2 Battery, Royal Australian Field Artillery (Permanent)
    - 7th, 8th, and 9th Companies, Australian Garrison Artillery
    - Nos. 5, 6, and 7 Companies, Royal Australian Garrison Artillery (Permanent)
    - 7th and 8th Field Companies, Australian Engineers
    - 19th and 21st Signal Troops, and 26th Signal Company
    - 34th and 38th Fortress Companies
    - Submarine Mining and Electric Light Sections, Royal Australian Engineers (Permanent)
    - Port Phillip Defences
    - No. 1 Flight, Australian Flying Corps (Note: No. 1 Flight, Australian Flying Corps was formed in the 3rd Military District on 14 July 1914.)
    - 13th, 14th, 15th, 16th, 28th, and 30th Companies, Australian Army Service Corps
    - 13th, 14th, 16th, and 17th Field Ambulances
    - 28th and 30th Light Horse Field Ambulances
    - 45th Company, Australian Army Medical Corps
  - 4th Military District – South Australia
    - 19th Infantry Brigade (74th (Boothby), 76th (Hindmarsh), 78th (Adelaide Rifles), 79th (Torrens), and 81st (Wakefield) Infantry Battalions)
    - 8th Light Horse Brigade (22nd (South Australian Mounted Rifles), 23rd (Barossa), and 24th (Flinders) Light Horse Regiments)
    - 34th and 35th Batteries, Australian Field Artillery (unallotted)
    - 10th Company, Australian Garrison Artillery
    - No. 10 Company, Royal Australian Garrison Artillery (Permanent)
    - 12th Field Company, Australian Engineers
    - 22nd Signal Troop and 28th Signal Company
    - 19th, 20th, and 31st Companies, Australian Army Service Corps
    - 19th Field Ambulance
    - 31st Light Horse Field Ambulance
    - 50th Company, Australian Army Medical Corps
  - 5th Military District – Western Australia
    - 22nd Infantry Brigade (84th (Goldfields Infantry), 86th (Western Australian Rifles), and 88th (Perth) Infantry Battalions)
    - 25th (Western Australian Mounted Infantry) Light Horse Regiment
    - 37th and 38th Batteries, Australian Field Artillery (unallotted)
    - 11th and 12th Companies, Australian Garrison Artillery
    - Nos. 11 and 12 Companies, Royal Australian Garrison Artillery (Permanent)
    - 13th Field Company, Australian Engineers
    - 30th Signal Company
    - 35th Fortress Company
    - 22nd Company, Australian Army Service Corps
    - 21st and 22nd Field Ambulance
  - 6th Military District – Tasmania
    - 23rd Infantry Brigade (91st (Tasmanian Rangers), 92nd (Launceston), and 93rd (Derwent) Infantry Battalions)
    - 26th (Tasmanian Mounted Infantry) Light Horse Regiment
    - 40th and 41st Batteries, Australian Field Artillery (unallotted)
    - 13th Company, Australian Garrison Artillery
    - No. 13 Company, Royal Australian Garrison Artillery (Permanent)
    - 14th Field Company, Australian Engineers
    - 31st Signal Company
    - 36th Fortress Company
    - 23rd Company, Australian Army Service Corps
    - 23rd Field Ambulance
  - Administrative and Instructional Staff
  - Australian Intelligence Corps (Note: The Australian Intelligence Corps was disbanded on 30 September 1914 and replaced by Intelligence Sections which were formed in each Military District. It was reformed in 1939.)
  - Australian Army Veterinary Corps
  - Australian Army Volunteer Automobile Corps (Note: The Australian Volunteer Automobile Corps was disbanded in 1915.)
  - Australian Army Pay Corps
  - Australian Army Medical Corps Reserve
  - Australian Army Nursing Service
  - Royal Military College of Australia – Duntroon
  - Central Flying School – Point Cook, Victoria
  - School of Gunnery
  - School of Musketry

Note: By July 1914, there were 52 infantry battalions which had been raised in the Citizen Forces out of a planned 93. Battalions numbered 1, 5, 6, 10, 12, 13, 15, 17, 20, 22, 23, 27, 28, 30, 32, 35, 36, 40, 42, 44, 45, 47, 50, 53, 54, 57, 59, 61, 62, 65, 68, 69, 72, 75, 77, 80, 82, 83, 85, 87, 89, and 90 were not assigned. In addition there were 23 regiments of light horse, out of a planned 29. Regiments numbered 8, 10, 12, 14, 18, 21 had not been assigned.

Australian Naval and Military Expeditionary Force

- Nos. 1, 2, 3, 4, 5 and 6 Company, Royal Australian Naval Reserve
- 1st Battalion, AN&MEF ('A','B','C','D','E','F','G' and 'H' Company)
- The Kennedy Regiment (militia) – left in Port Moresby
- Nos. 1 and 2 Machine Gun Sections
- Signals Section
- Medical Detachment

Australian Imperial Force

- 1st Division
  - 1st Brigade (1st, 2nd, 3rd, and 4th Battalions)
  - 2nd Brigade (5th, 6th, 7th, and 8th Battalions)
  - 3rd Brigade (9th, 10th, 11th, and 12th Battalions)
  - 1st Division Artillery
    - 1st, 2nd and 3rd Field Artillery Brigades
    - 1st Heavy Battery
    - 1st Division Ammunition Column
  - 1st Division Engineers
    - 1st, 2nd, 3rd Field Companies, and 1st Signals Company
  - 1st, 2nd, and 3rd Field Ambulances
  - Divisional Train
  - 4th Light Horse Regiment (divisional cavalry)
- 4th Brigade (13th, 14th, 15th, and 16th Battalions)
- 1st Light Horse Brigade (1st, 2nd, and 3rd Light Horse Regiments)
- 2nd Light Horse Brigade (5th, 6th, and 7th Light Horse Regiments)
- 3rd Light Horse Brigade (8th, 9th, and 10th Light Horse Regiments)

=== 1918 ===
Australian Army Order of Battle, August – September 1918

Australian Military Forces

- Military Board
  - Department of the Chief of the General Staff (Commonwealth Section, Imperial General Staff)
  - Department of the Adjutant-General
  - Department of the Quartermaster-General
  - Department of the Chief of Ordnance
  - Department of the Civil Member
  - Department of Inspector-General
  - 1st Military District – Queensland (including New Guinea and the Northern Territory)
    - 1st Infantry Brigade (1st, 2nd (Kennedy Regiment), 3rd (Port Curtis), and 4th (Wide Bay) Infantry Battalions)
    - 2nd Infantry Brigade (5th Infantry, 6th Infantry, 7th (Morton Regiment), and 8th (Oxley) Infantry Battalions)
    - 3rd Infantry Brigade (9th (Logan and Albert), 10th, 11th (Darling Downs), and 12th (Byron) Infantry Battalions)
    - 1st Light Horse Brigade (1st (Central Queensland), 2nd (Queensland Mounted Infantry), 3rd (Darling Downs), and 4th (Northern Rivers Lancers) Light Horse Regiments)
    - 27th (North Queensland) Light Horse Regiment (divisional cavalry)
    - 1st Australian Field Artillery Brigade (1st, 2nd, 3rd, and 4th Batteries)
    - No. 3 Battery, Royal Australian Field Artillery (Permanent)
    - 1st and 2nd Companies, Australian Garrison Artillery
    - Nos. 8 and 9 Companies, Royal Australian Garrison Artillery (Permanent)
    - 1st and 2nd Field Companies, Australian Engineers
    - 15th Signal Troop and 23rd Signal Company
    - 32nd Fortress Company
    - 1st, 2nd, 3rd, and 24th Companies, Australian Army Service Corps
    - 1st and 2nd Field Ambulances
    - 24th Light Horse Field Ambulance
    - 33rd Company, Australian Army Medical Corps
  - 2nd Military District – New South Wales
    - 4th Infantry Brigade (13th, 14th (Hunter River), 15th, and 16th (Newcastle Regiment) Infantry Battalions)
    - 5th Infantry Brigade (17th, 18th (North Sydney), 19th (Kuring-Gai), and 20th (Parramatta) Infantry Battalions)
    - 6th Infantry Brigade (21st (Woollahra), 22nd, 23rd, and 24th (East Sydney Regiment) Infantry Battalions)
    - 7th Infantry Brigade (25th (City of Sydney), 26th, 27th, and 28th Infantry Battalions)
    - 8th Infantry Brigade (29th (Australian Rifles), 30th, 31st (Leichhardt), and 32nd Infantry Battalions)
    - 9th Infantry Brigade (33rd, 34th (South Sydney), 35th, and 36th Infantry Battalions)
    - 10th Infantry Brigade (37th (Illawarra), 38th, 39th, and 40th Infantry Battalions)
    - 11th Infantry Brigade (41st (Blue Mountains), 42nd (Lachlan-Macquarie), 43rd (Werriwa), and 44th (Riverina) Infantry Battalions)
    - Sydney University Scouts
    - 2nd Light Horse Brigade (5th (New England) and 6th (Hunter River Lancers) Light Horse Regiments)
    - 3rd Light Horse Brigade (7th (New South Wales Lancers), 9th (New South Wales Mounted Rifles), and 11th (Australian Horse) Light Horse Regiment)
    - 28th (Illawarra) Light Horse Regiment (divisional cavalry)
    - 4th Australian Field Artillery Brigade (10th, 11th, and 12th Batteries)
    - 5th Australian Field Artillery Brigade (13th and 14th Batteries)
    - 6th Australian Field Artillery Brigade (16th, 17th, 18th, and 44th Batteries)
    - No. 1 Battery, Royal Australian Field Artillery (Permanent)
    - 3rd, 4th, 5th, and 6th Companies, Australian Garrison Artillery
    - Nos. 1, 2, 3 and 4 Companies, Royal Australian Garrison Artillery (Permanent)
    - 3rd, 4th, 5th, and 6th Field Companies, Australian Engineers
    - 16th and 17th Signal Troops, 24th and 25th Signal Companies
    - 33rd, 37th and 39th Fortress Companies
    - Submarine Mining and Electric Light Section, Royal Australian Engineers (Permanent)
    - Port Jackson Defences
    - No. 1 Flight, Australian Flying Corps
    - 4th, 5th, 6th, 7th, 8th, 9th, 10th, 11th, 25th, and 26th Companies, Australian Army Service Corps
    - 4th, 5th, 6th, 7th, 8th, 9th, 10th, and 11th Field Ambulances
    - 25th and 26th Light Horse Field Ambulances
    - 39th and 40th Companies, Australian Army Medical Corps
  - 3rd Military District – Victoria
    - 12th Infantry Brigade (45th (Gippsland), 46th (Brighton Rifles), 47th, and 48th (Kooyong) Infantry Battalions)
    - 13th Infantry Brigade (49th (Prahran), 50th (St Kilda), 51st (Albert Park), and 52nd (Hobson's Bay) Infantry Battalions)
    - 14th Infantry Brigade (53rd (Glenferrie), 54th (Merri), 55th (Collingwood), and 56th (The Yarra Borderers) Infantry Battalions)
    - 15th Infantry Brigade (57th, 58th (Essendon Rifles), 59th (Moreland Rifles), and 60th (Brunswick-Carlton) Infantry Battalions)
    - 16th Infantry Brigade (61st, 62nd (Carlton Rifles), 63rd (The East Melbourne Regiment), and 64th (City of Melbourne Regiment) Infantry Battalions)
    - 17th Infantry Brigade (65th (City of Footscray Regiment), 66th (Mount Alexander), 67th (Bendigo), and 68th Infantry Battalions)
    - 18th Infantry Brigade (69th, 70th (Ballarat Regiment), 71st (City of Ballarat), 72nd, and 73rd (Victorian Rangers) Infantry Battalions)
    - Melbourne University Rifles
    - 5th Light Horse Brigade (13th (Gippsland), 15th (Victorian Mounted Rifles), and 16th (Indi) Light Horse Regiments)
    - 7th Light Horse Brigade (17th (Campaspe), 19th (Yarrowee), and 20th (Corangamite) Light Horse Regiments)
    - 29th (Port Phillip Horse) Light Horse Regiment (divisional cavalry)
    - 7th Australian Field Artillery Brigade (19th, 20th, 21st, and 25th Batteries)
    - 8th Australian Field Artillery Brigade (22nd, 23rd, 31st, and 46th Batteries)
    - No. 2 Battery, Royal Australian Field Artillery (Permanent)
    - 7th, 8th, and 9th Companies, Australian Garrison Artillery
    - Nos. 5, 6, and 7 Companies, Royal Australian Garrison Artillery (Permanent)
    - 7th, 8th, 9th and 10th Field Companies, Australian Engineers
    - 19th and 21st Signal Troops, 26th and 27th Signal Companies
    - 34th and 38th Fortress Companies
    - Submarine Mining and Electric Light Sections, Royal Australian Engineers (Permanent)
    - Port Phillip Defences
    - No. 2 Flight, Australian Flying Corps
    - 12th, 13th, 14th, 15th, 16th, 17th, 18th, 28th, and 30th Companies, Australian Army Service Corps
    - 12th, 13th, 14th, 15th, 16th, 17th and 18th Field Ambulances
    - 28th and 30th Light Horse Field Ambulances
    - 45th and 49th Companies, Australian Army Medical Corps
  - 4th Military District – South Australia
    - 19th Infantry Brigade (74th (Boothby), 75th, 76th (Hindmarsh), 77th, and 78th (Adelaide Rifles) Infantry Battalions)
    - 20th Infantry Brigade (79th (Torrens), 80th (Gawler), 81st (Wakefield), and 82nd (Barrier) Infantry Battalions)
    - 8th Light Horse Brigade (22nd (South Australian Mounted Rifles), 23rd (Barossa), and 24th (Flinders) Light Horse Regiments)
    - 12th Australian Artillery Field Brigade (34th and 35th Batteries)
    - 10th Company, Australian Garrison Artillery
    - No. 10 Company, Royal Australian Garrison Artillery (Permanent)
    - 11th and 12th Field Companies, Australian Engineers
    - 22nd Signal Troop and 28th Signal Company
    - 19th, 20th, and 31st Companies, Australian Army Service Corps
    - 19th and 20th Field Ambulances
    - 31st Light Horse Field Ambulance
    - 50th Company, Australian Army Medical Corps
  - 5th Military District – Western Australia
    - 21st Infantry Brigade (84th (Goldfields Regiment) and 85th Infantry Battalions)
    - 22nd Infantry Brigade (86th (Western Australian Rifles), 87th, 88th (Perth), and 89th Infantry Battalions)
    - 25th (Western Australian Mounted Infantry) Light Horse Regiment (part of 12th Mixed Brigade)
    - 13th Australian Artillery Field Brigade (37th and 38th Batteries)
    - 11th and 12th Companies, Australian Garrison Artillery
    - Nos. 11 and 12 Companies, Royal Australian Garrison Artillery (Permanent)
    - 13th Field Company, Australian Engineers
    - 30th Signal Company
    - 35th Fortress Company
    - 22nd Company, Australian Army Service Corps
    - 21st and 22nd Field Ambulance
    - 53rd Company, Australian Army Medical Corps
  - 6th Military District – Tasmania
    - 23rd Infantry Brigade (90th, 91st (Tasmanian Rangers), 92nd (Launceston), and 93rd (Derwent) Infantry Battalions)
    - 26th (Tasmanian Mounted Infantry) Light Horse Regiment (part of 13th Mixed Brigade)
    - 14th Australian Field Artillery Brigade (40th and 41st Batteries)
    - 13th Company, Australian Garrison Artillery
    - No. 13 Company, Royal Australian Garrison Artillery (Permanent)
    - 14th Field Company, Australian Engineers
    - 31st Signal Company
    - 36th Fortress Company
    - 23rd Company, Australian Army Service Corps
    - 23rd Field Ambulance
    - 54th Company, Australian Army Medical Corps
  - Administrative and Instructional Staff
  - Australian Army Veterinary Corps
  - Australian Army Pay Corps
  - Australian Army Medical Corps Reserve
  - Australian Army Nursing Service
  - Royal Military College of Australia – Duntroon
  - School of Gunnery
  - School of Musketry

Australian Naval and Military Expeditionary Force

- 3rd and 4th Battalions, AN&MEF (Tropical Force) – German New Guinea

Australian Imperial Force

- Australian Corps – Western Front
  - 1st Division
    - 1st Brigade (1st, 2nd, 3rd, 4th Battalions, and 1st Light Trench Mortar Battery)
    - 2nd Brigade (5th, 6th, 7th, 8th Battalions, and 2nd Light Trench Mortar Battery)
    - 3rd Brigade (9th, 10th, 11th, 12th Battalions, and 3rd Light Trench Mortar Battery)
    - 1st Pioneer Battalion
    - 1st Machine Gun Battalion
    - 1st Division Artillery
      - 1st and 2nd Field Artillery Brigades
      - 1st and 2nd Medium Trench Mortar Batteries
      - 1st Division Ammunition Column
    - 1st Division Engineers
      - 1st, 2nd, 3rd Field Companies, and 1st Signals Company
    - 1st, 2nd, and 3rd Field Ambulances
    - Salvage Company, Veterinary Section and Divisional Train
  - 2nd Division
    - 5th Brigade (17th, 18th, 19th, 20th Battalions, and 5th Light Trench Mortar Battery)
    - 6th Brigade (21st, 22nd, 23rd, 24th Battalions, and 6th Light Trench Mortar Battery)
    - 7th Brigade (25th, 26th, 27th, 28th Battalions, and 7th Light Trench Mortar Battery)
    - 2nd Pioneer Battalion
    - 2nd Machine Gun Battalion
    - 2nd Division Artillery
      - 4th and 5th Field Artillery Brigades
      - 3rd and 4th Medium Trench Mortar Batteries
      - 2nd Division Ammunition Column
    - 2nd Division Engineers
      - 5th, 6th, 7th Field Companies, and 2nd Signals Company
    - 5th, 6th, and 7th Field Ambulances
    - Salvage Company, Veterinary Section and Divisional Train
  - 3rd Division
    - 9th Brigade (33rd, 34th, 35th, 36th Battalions, and 9th Light Trench Mortar Battery)
    - 10th Brigade (37th, 38th, 39th, 40th Battalions, and 10th Light Trench Mortar Battery)
    - 11th Brigade (41st, 42nd, 43rd, 44th Battalions, and 11th Light Trench Mortar Battery)
    - 3rd Pioneer Battalion
    - 3rd Machine Gun Battalion
    - 3rd Division Artillery
      - 7th and 8th Field Artillery Brigades
      - 5th and 6th Medium Trench Mortar Batteries
      - 3rd Division Ammunition Column
    - 3rd Division Engineers
      - 9th, 10th, 11th Field Companies, and 3rd Signals Company
    - 9th, 10th, and 11th Field Ambulances
    - Salvage Company, Veterinary Section and Divisional Train
  - 4th Division
    - 4th Brigade (13th, 14th, 15th, 16th Battalions, and 4th Light Trench Mortar Battery)
    - 12th Brigade (45th, 46th, 47th, 48th Battalions, and 12th Light Trench Mortar Battery)
    - 13th Brigade (49th, 50th, 51st, 52nd Battalions, and 13th Light Trench Mortar Battery)
    - 4th Pioneer Battalion
    - 4th Machine Gun Battalion
    - 4th Division Artillery
      - 10th and 11th Field Artillery Brigades
      - 7th and 8th Medium Trench Mortar Batteries
      - 4th Division Ammunition Column
    - 4th Division Engineers
      - 4th, 12th, and 13th Field Companies
    - 4th, 12th, and 13th Field Ambulances
    - Salvage Company, Veterinary Section and Divisional Train
  - 5th Division
    - 8th Brigade (29th, 30th, 31st, 32nd Battalions, and 8th Light Trench Mortar Battery)
    - 14th Brigade (53rd, 54th, 55th, 56th Battalions, and 14th Light Trench Mortar Battery)
    - 15th Brigade (57th, 58th, 59th, 60th Battalions, and 15th Light Trench Mortar Battery)
    - 5th Pioneer Battalion
    - 5th Machine Gun Battalion
    - 5th Division Artillery
      - 13th and 14th Field Artillery Brigades
      - 9th and 10th Medium Trench Mortar Batteries
      - 5th Division Ammunition Column
    - 5th Division Engineers
      - 8th, 14th, 15th Field Companies, and 5th Signals Company
    - 8th, 14th, and 15th Field Ambulances
    - Salvage Company, Veterinary Section and Divisional Train
  - Corps troops
    - 13th Light Horse Regiment
    - 1st Cyclist Battalion
    - 3rd Army Artillery Brigade
    - 6th Army Artillery Brigade
    - 12th Army Artillery Brigade
    - 1st Siege Artillery Brigade
    - V Heavy Trench Mortar Battery
    - 1st Army Troops Company
- 1st, 2nd and 3rd Australian Tunnelling Companies – Western Front
- ANZAC Mounted Division – Middle East
  - 1st Light Horse Brigade (1st, 2nd, 3rd Light Horse Regiments, and 1st Machine Gun Squadron)
  - 2nd Light Horse Brigade (5th, 6th, 7th Light Horse Regiments, and 2nd Machine Gun Squadron)
  - 1st Field Squadron
  - 1st and 2nd Light Horse Field Ambulances
  - Veterinary units and Divisional Train
- Australian Mounted Division – Middle East
  - 3rd Light Horse Brigade (8th, 9th, 10th Light Horse Regiments, and 3rd Machine Gun Squadron)
  - 4th Light Horse Brigade (4th, 11th, 12th Light Horse Regiments, and 4th Machine Gun Squadron)
  - 5th Light Horse Brigade (14th and 15th Light Horse Regiments)
  - 2nd Field Squadron
  - 3rd, 4th, and 5th Light Horse Field Ambulances
  - Veterinary units and Divisional Train
- 1st Light Car Patrol – Middle East
- Australian Flying Corps
  - No. 1 Squadron – Middle East
  - Nos. 2, 3, and 4 Squadrons – Western Front
  - 1st (Training) Wing – England
    - Nos. 5, 6, 7, and 8 Squadrons
- Central Flying School – Point Cook, Victoria (designated No. 1 Home Training Depot) (Note: The Central Flying School became part of the AIF on 9 September 1918.)
  - No. 1 Home Training Squadron
  - Aeroplane Repair Section
- 1st Australian Wireless Signal Squadron – Iraq and Iran
- Miscellaneous units in France, Belgium, Egypt and Palestine
  - 1st, 2nd, 3rd, and 14th General Hospitals
  - 1st, 2nd, and 3rd Auxiliary Hospitals
  - 1st Dermatological Hospital
  - 2nd Stationary Hospital
  - 1st, 2nd, and 3rd Casualty Clearing Stations
  - Australian Electrical Mining & Mechanical Boring Company
  - Australian Railway Group
  - Sea Transport Service
- AIF depots in England
  - 1st Training Brigade
  - 2nd Training Brigade
  - 3rd Training Brigade
  - Reserve Artillery Brigade
  - Engineer Training Depot
  - Convalescent Depots

== See also ==
- World War I defences of Australia
- Australian Army during World War I
- Structure of the Australian Army during World War II

== Notes ==
Footnotes

Citations

== Bibliography ==
- Australian Military Forces (1914). Staff and Regimental Lists of the Australian Military Forces, 1st January 1914. Melbourne, Victoria: Government Printer. OCLC 681165642.
- Australian Military Forces (1918). Officers' List of the Australian Military Forces, 1st August 1918. Melbourne, Victoria: Government Printer. OCLC 48935638.
- Bou, Jean (2010). Light Horse: A History of Australia's Mounted Arm. Port Melbourne, Victoria: Cambridge University Press. ISBN 9780521197083.
- Coulthard-Clark, Chris (1991). The Third Brother: The Royal Australian Air Force 1921–39. North Sydney: Allen & Unwin. ISBN 0-04-442307-1.
- Dennis, Peter; Grey, Jeffrey; Morris, Ewan; Prior, Robin; Bou, Jean (2008). The Oxford Companion to Australian Military History (Second ed.). Melbourne: Oxford University Press. ISBN 978-0195517842.
- Falls, Cyril; MacMunn, George (1930). Military Operations Egypt & Palestine From the Outbreak of War With Germany to June 1917. Official History of the Great War Based on Official Documents by Direction of the Historical Section of the Committee of Imperial Defence. Vol. 1. London: HM Stationery Office. OCLC 610273484.
- Fleming, Robert (2012). The Australian Army in World War I. Men at Arms. Oxford, United Kingdom: Osprey. ISBN 978-1849086325.
- Grey (2008). A Military History of Australia (3rd ed.). Melbourne, Victoria: Cambridge University Press. ISBN 978-0-521-69791-0.
- Isaacs, Keith (1971). Military Aircraft of Australia 1909–1918. Canberra: Australian War Memorial. ISBN 9780642993748.
- Hall, Richard John (1968). The Australian Light Horse. Blackburn, Victoria: W.D. Joynt & Co. OCLC 59504.
- Kuring, Ian (2004). Red Coats to Cams: A History of Australian Infantry 1788 to 2001. Sydney, New South Wales: Australian Military History Publications. ISBN 1-876439-99-8.
- MacKenzie, Seaforth (1941). The Australians at Rabaul: The Capture and Administration of the German Possessions in the South Pacific. Official History of Australia in the War of 1914–1918. Vol. X (10th ed.). Sydney, New South Wales: Angus and Robertson. OCLC 12752502.
- Palazzo, Albert (2001). The Australian Army: A History of its Organisation 1901–2001. Melbourne, Victoria: Oxford University Press. ISBN 0195515072.
- Palazzo, Albert (2002). Defenders of Australia: The 3rd Australian Division 1916–1991. Loftus, New South Wales: Australian Military Historical Publications. ISBN 1-876439-03-3.
- Scott, Ernest (1941) [1936]. Australia During the War. Official History of Australia in the War of 1914–1918. Vol. XI (7th ed.). Canberra, Australian Capital Territory: Australian War Memorial. OCLC 7466425.
- Stevenson, Robert (2007). "The Forgotten First: The 1st Australian Division in the Great War and its Legacy" (PDF). Australian Army Journal. IV (1): 185–199. OCLC 30798241. Archived from the original (PDF) on 3 December 2013.
- Stevenson, Robert (2013). To Win the Battle: The 1st Australian Division in the Great War, 1914–1918. Port Melbourne, Victoria: Cambridge University Press. ISBN 9781107028685.
- Wilcox, Craig (1999). "Defending Australia 1914–1918: The Other Australian Army". In Dennis, Peter; Grey, Jeffrey (eds.). 1918 Defining Victory: Proceedings of the Chief of Army's History Conference Held at the National Convention Centre, Canberra, 29 September 1998. Canberra, Australian Capital Territory: Army History Unit. ISBN 0731705106.
