= Structure of the Australian Army during World War II =

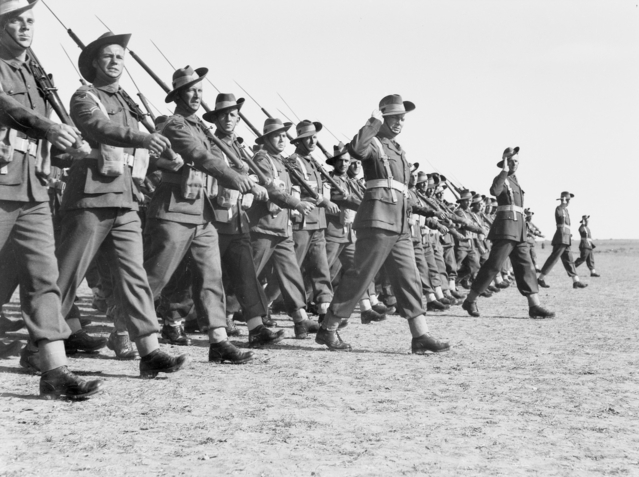
Members of the 9th Division during a formal parade in late 1942

The structure of the Australian Army changed considerably during World War II. At the outbreak of war the Army comprised a small regular component and a large, but ill-trained and equipped, militia force. In September 1939 the government authorised the establishment of the Second Australian Imperial Force for overseas service; this force eventually reached a strength of four infantry divisions, an armoured division and various headquarters and support units. The militia force, which remained in Australia, was neglected until the outbreak of the Pacific War.

The militia units were fully activated in late 1941, and additional such formations were established in 1942. Despite the loss of the 8th Division in February 1942, the Army reached its peak strength of eleven infantry divisions and three armoured divisions later that year. This force was larger than what the Australian economy could support, however, and was gradually reduced in size. At the end of 1943 the Government determined that the Army's strength was to be six infantry divisions and two armoured brigades, though further reductions were ordered in August 1944 and June 1945. If the conflict had continued past August 1945, the size of the Army would have been further reduced to three divisions.

Following the end of the war the Australian Army was rapidly demobilized. However, the force formed for occupation duties in Australia became the nucleus of the permanent Australian Regular Army, and a large number of militia units continued to be maintained.

== Orders of battle ==
=== 3 September 1939 ===
On the outbreak of war, the Army comprised the following major units:

- Military Board
- Army Headquarters
  - 1st Division
  - 2nd Division
  - 3rd Division
  - 4th Division
  - 5th Division
  - 1st Cavalry Division
  - 2nd Cavalry Division
  - Department of the Chief of the General Staff
    - 1st Military District – Queensland
    - 2nd Military District – New South Wales
    - 3rd Military District – Victoria
    - 4th Military District – South Australia
    - 5th Military District – Western Australia
    - 6th Military District – Tasmania
    - 7th Military District – Northern Territory
    - 8th Military District – New Guinea
    - Royal Military College, Duntroon
    - Command and Staff School
    - Small Arms School
    - Army Service Corps Training School
    - School of Artillery
  - Department of the Adjutant-General
  - Department of the Quartermaster-General and Master-General of the Ordnance

=== 9 April 1942 ===
The Army was restructured in 1942, with major units as follows:

- Land Headquarters
  - First Army
    - I Corps
      - 3rd Division
      - 7th Division
    - 5th Division
    - 1st Motor Division
    - II Corps
      - 1st Division
      - 2nd Division
      - 10th Division
  - Second Army
    - 2nd Motor Division
    - Tasmania Force
    - US 41st Division
  - III Corps
    - 4th Division
  - Northern Territory Force
    - 19th Brigade Group
    - Northern Territory Lines of Communication Area
  - New Guinea Force
  - LHQ Reserve
    - 1st Armoured Division
    - 2/2nd Pioneer Battalion
    - 2/1st Machine Gun Battalion
  - LHQ Troops
  - AIF (Overseas)
    - 6th Division
    - 9th Division
  - Queensland Line of Communications Area
  - New South Wales Line of Communication Area
  - Victoria Line of Communication Area
  - South Australia Line of Communication Area
  - Tasmania Line of Communication Area
  - Western Australia Line of Communication Area
  - New Guinea Line of Communication Area

=== 15 August 1945 ===
The structure of the Army's major combat units and commands at the end of the war was as follows:

- Land Headquarters
  - I Corps
    - 7th Division
    - 9th Division
  - 4th Armoured Brigade Group (Land Headquarters reserve)
  - First Army
    - 6th Division
    - 11th Division
    - 8th Brigade
    - Pacific Islands Regiment
    - II Corps
      - 3rd Division
      - 11th Brigade
      - 23rd Brigade
  - Second Army
    - 1st Brigade
    - 5th Division [was transferred to Queensland Line of Communications Area on 19 August]
  - Northern Territory Force
    - 12th Brigade
  - Western Command
  - New South Wales Line of Communications Area
  - Queensland Line of Communications Area
  - South Australia Line of Communications Area
  - Tasmania Line of Communications Area
  - Victoria Line of Communications Area

== See also ==
- Australian Army during World War II
- Australian armoured units of World War II
- List of Australian divisions in World War II
- Anti-aircraft defences of Australia during World War II
- Coastal defences of Australia during World War II
- Jungle division
- Structure of the Australian Army during World War I
