= Henry Wynter =

Australian Army officer

Henry Douglas Wynter
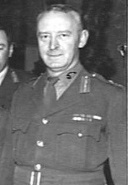
- Lieutenant General Henry Wynter
- Born: 5 June 1886; Gin Gin, Queensland
- Died: 7 February 1945 (aged 58); Heidelberg, Victoria
- Military career
- Allegiance: Australia
- Branch: Australian Army
- Service years: 1907–1945
- Rank: Lieutenant General
- Service number: QX6150
- Commands: Eastern Command (1941–42); 2nd Military District (1941–42); 9th Division (1940–41); AIF in the United Kingdom (1940); Northern Command (1939–40); 1st Military District (1939–40); Army Command and Staff College (1938–39)
- Conflicts: First World War; Battle of Messines; Battle of Passchendaele; Hundred Days Offensive; Second World War
- Awards: Companion of the Order of the Bath; Companion of the Order of St Michael and St George; Distinguished Service Order; Mentioned in Despatches (4)

Lieutenant General Henry Douglas Wynter, CB, CMG, DSO (6 June 1886 – 7 February 1945) was an Australian Army officer who rose to the rank of lieutenant general during the Second World War. Official Historian Gavin Long described him as "perhaps the clearest and most profound thinker the Australian Army of his generation had produced."

Wynter joined the Australian Army as a reservist in 1907 before becoming a regular officer in 1911. On duty in Queensland when the Great War broke out in 1914, he joined the 11th Infantry Brigade in 1916 as its brigade major. He served on a series of staff posts on the Western Front. After the war attended the Staff College, Camberley and Imperial Defence College.

Wynter's public criticism of the government's Singapore strategy led to his being reduced in rank and sent to Queensland. In 1938 he assumed command of the Army Command and Staff College. In 1940 he accepted a reduction in rank to become the Deputy Adjutant and Quartermaster General of I Corps. Wynter embarked for the Middle East in May 1940 with the advance party of I Corps but the convoy he was travelling with was diverted to the United Kingdom. He was appointed to command the AIF there, with a key role in the defence of southern England. In October 1940 his force became the nucleus of a new 9th Division, which he was appointed to command. Ill-health forced him to return to Australia, where he became Lieutenant General Administration.

== Education and early life ==
Henry Douglas Wynter was born on 5 June 1886 at Gin Gin, Queensland, the sixth surviving child of Henry Philip Walter Wynter, a sugarcane farmer, and his Maria Louisa née Maunsell. He was educated at Maryborough Grammar School, where he served in the Australian Army Cadets.

Wynter was a lieutenant of Cadets from 1 July 1906 to 2 February 1907. On 26 February 1907 he was commissioned as a second lieutenant in a Militia unit, the Wide Bay Infantry Regiment. He was promoted to lieutenant on 24 March 1908 and captain on 24 June 1909. On 1 February 1911 Wynter transferred to the Administrative and Instructional Staff of the 1st Military District (Queensland), nominally with the rank of probationary lieutenant, but he was allowed to retain his Militia rank of captain. He was promoted to captain in the Permanent Military Forces on 1 July 1913.

Wynter married Ethel May White, a nurse, on 5 September 1913. They eventually had two sons.

== First World War ==
Wynter joined the First Australian Imperial Force on 24 April 1916 as a major, having been promoted to the brevet rank on 1 December 1915. He became brigade major of the 11th Infantry Brigade, part of the newly formed 3rd Division. At this time Wynter noticed his eyesight was deteriorating, and he was supplied with glasses. Wynter embarked for the United Kingdom from Sydney with the 11th Infantry Brigade headquarters on the transport HMAT Demosthenes on 18 May 1916, arriving on 20 July 1916.

The 3rd Division continued its training on the Salisbury Plain in England but in October 1916 Wynter was sent to the 4th Division in France as its Deputy Assistant Adjutant and Quartermaster General (DAA&QMG). On 24 March 1917, he was transferred to I Anzac Corps headquarters as its Deputy Assistant Adjutant General (DAAG). He was promoted to lieutenant colonel on 23 July 1917. On 6 July 1918 he was among a small number of Australian officers who accompanied General Sir William Birdwood to Fifth Army headquarters. He rejoined the Australian Corps headquarters on 1 February 1919. For his services as a staff officer, Wynter was mentioned in despatches four times, was awarded the Distinguished Service Order and made a Companion of the Order of St Michael and St George.

== Between the wars ==
Wynter returned to Australia, disembarking in Sydney on 19 February 1920. His AIF appointment was terminated on 18 April 1920 and he reverted to his permanent rank of major. He was entitled to retain his AIF rank as an honorary rank but would not be promoted to the substantive rank until 1 October 1931. Wynter was posted to the 4th Military District (South Australia) but his sojourn in Australia was brief. On 19 November 1920 he re-embarked for the United Kingdom to attend the Staff College, Camberley. The first two post-war classes at the re-opened Staff College were awash with distinguished students. Twenty had been brigadier generals; five had been awarded the Victoria Cross and no less than 170, including Wynter, had been awarded the Distinguished service Order. On returning to Australia in 1923, Wynter was posted to Army Headquarters in Melbourne as a staff officer. In 1925, he became Director of Mobilisation, responsible for the development of war plans.

Wynter published a paper on the command of the Imperial forces in wartime in the British Army Quarterly in 1925. He became a notable critic of the Singapore strategy of the government of Prime Minister Stanley Bruce. In September 1926 he delivered a lecture to the United Services Institute of Victoria entitled "The Strategical Inter-relationship of the Navy, the Army and the Air Force: and Australian View", which was subsequently published in the British Army Quarterly in April 1927. In this article Wynter argued that if war was most likely to break out in the Pacific at a time when the United Kingdom was involved in a crisis in Europe which would prevent it from sending sufficient resources to Singapore and that Singapore was vulnerable, especially to attack from the land and air. Wynter argued for a more balanced policy of building up the Army and Royal Australian Air Force, rather than relying on the Royal Australian Navy, which was receiving the lion's share of defence funding at the time. Wynter attended the Imperial Defence College in 1930. Soon after returning to Australia, Wynter became director of Military Training, with the acting rank of colonel.

Following the visit of the British Cabinet Secretary, Sir Maurice Hankey, to Australia in 1934, political interest in the Singapore Strategy debate rose. A copy of Wynter's 1927 paper came into the possession of Senator Charles Brand, who had it copied and circulated amongst the members of the Parliament of Australia. On 5 November 1936, the Leader of the Opposition, John Curtin used the paper to bolster a strong attack on the policies of the Minister for Defence, Archdale Parkhill. Parkhill was further embarrassed by an article in the Daily Telegraph written by Wynter's son Philip, that Parkhill believed contained classified information. In retaliation, in March 1937, Parkhill had Wynter posted to the staff of the 11th Mixed Brigade in Queensland at his substantive rank of lieutenant colonel, with a consequentially reduced salary. At the same time, Parkhill withdrew his recommendation for the Chief of the General Staff, Lieutenant General John Lavarack, another opponent of the Singapore strategy, to be awarded a Companion of the Order of the Bath.

Parkhill lost his seat in the 1937 election and Lavarack recalled Wynter, who had been promoted to colonel on 1 July 1937, to command the new Army Command and Staff College, which opened at Victoria Barracks, Sydney on 1 July 1938. This was an important initiative for Lavarack, who was concerned that, just as politicians were uncritically following the Singapore strategy, too many military officers were uncritically adopting British ideas. Lavarack hoped to "develop and teach a system which, while taking note generally of the British Army system, will also be suitable to our special conditions." Wynter was promoted to brigadier on 28 August 1939.

== Second World War ==
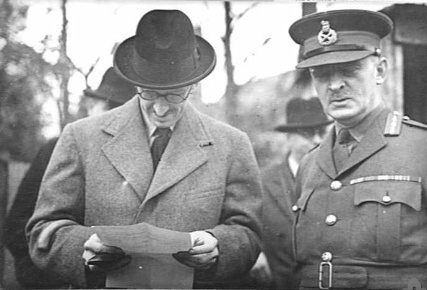
Major General H. D. Wynter with the Secretary of State for Dominion Affairs, Lord Cranborne

In October 1939, Wynter was promoted to major general and assumed command of Northern Command. In April 1940, I Corps was formed and Wynter accepted an offer from Lieutenant General Sir Thomas Blamey to become its Deputy Adjutant and Quartermaster General, its senior administrative officer, "a post somewhat smaller than his exceptional experience and talents deserved but the highest the overseas force could offer in the field". Acceptance also involved a drop in rank back to brigadier. Wynter joined the Second Australian Imperial Force on 22 April 1940, and was given the AIF serial number QX6150.

Wynter embarked from Melbourne on 15 May 1940 with the advance party of I Corps with orders to establish a base organisation in the Middle East but the convoy he was travelling with was diverted to the United Kingdom. Up until a couple of days before it arrived, the convoy had been under the command of Brigadier Leslie Morshead of the 18th Infantry Brigade but on 18 April, Wynter discovered that the Military Board back in Australia had promoted him to major general and appointed him to command the AIF in the United Kingdom. Wynter decided that, given the immediate danger of a German invasion of the United Kingdom, his force had to be ready to fight. He therefore reorganised the troops available to form a second infantry brigade. The 18th Infantry Brigade became the Southern Command Striking Force, with a key role in the defence of southern England. However, the anticipated invasion did not eventuate.

In September Wynter was informed that his force would become the nucleus of a new 9th Division and on 23 October 1940 he was appointed to command it. Wynter and 18th Infantry Brigade departed the United Kingdom for the Middle East in November 1940. In January 1941, the medical authorities deemed him medically unfit for further duty and ordered his return to Australia for treatment. He arrived back in Sydney on 12 April 1941 and his AIF appointment was terminated on 6 July 1941. For his service in the United Kingdom, he was appointed a Companion of the Order of the Bath on 1 January 1942.

Wynter assumed command of Eastern Command on 12 December 1941. In Blamey's reorganisation of the Army in April 1942, Wynter was appointed Lieutenant General Administration (LGA) at Allied Land Headquarters in Melbourne. As such he was in charge of all of the Army's logistical activities. His principal subordinates were the Adjutant General, Major General Victor Stantke; the Quartermaster General, Major General James Cannan; and the Master General of the Ordnance, Major General Leslie Beavis.

Suffering from high blood pressure, Wynter relinquished his post of LGA on 19 September 1944. The next day he was placed on the Supernumerary List pending retirement. He was admitted to the 115th General Hospital in Heidelberg, Victoria where he died on 7 February 1945. The medical officer listed the cause of death as uremia and hypertension. He was buried with military honours in Springvale cemetery.
