= Charles Lloyd (Australian general) =

Australian general

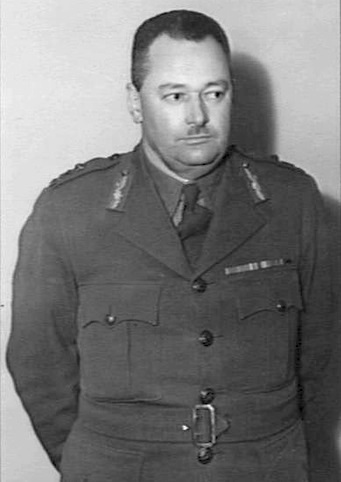
- Major General Charles Lloyd in 1945
- Born: 2 February 1899; South Fremantle, Western Australia
- Died: 31 May 1956 (aged 57); Nedlands, Western Australia
- Burial place: Karrakatta Cemetery, Perth
- Military career
- Allegiance: Australia
- Branch: Australian Army
- Service years: 1918-1946
- Rank: Major General
- Nickname: "Gaffer"
- Service number: VX4
- Conflicts: World War II; Siege of Tobruk
- Awards: Commander of the Order of the British Empire; Mentioned in Despatches (3)

Major General Charles Edward Maurice Lloyd, CBE (2 February 1899 – 31 May 1956) was a senior officer in the Australian Army. Lloyd graduated from the Royal Military College, Duntroon in 1918 as a regular officer in the artillery and subsequently served in a range of staff and regimental positions in the inter-war years. He later saw service in World War II, during which he held senior staff and administrative positions in the Middle East, the Netherlands East Indies, Papua and Australia. Later he worked as a newspaper executive, as chief of several United Nations agencies, and in private enterprise. Lloyd died in 1956.

== Early life ==
Charles Lloyd was born on 2 February 1899 in South Fremantle, Western Australia, the second and only surviving child of Thomas Edward Lloyd, a postmaster, and his wife Edith, née Lock. His parents separated in 1901 and two years later his father committed suicide. He was subsequently raised by his mother, who worked as a telephone attendant at Coolgardie, and then in Fremantle from 1909. Lloyd was educated at Beaconsfield, Fremantle Boys' Central and Perth Modern schools.

== Military career ==
Entering the Australian Army in 1915, Lloyd graduated from the Royal Military College, Duntroon in December 1918 as a regular officer in the artillery, too late to see action during World War I. Lloyd was nicknamed "Gaffer" by the other cadets due to his serious demeanor, and Gavin Long considered him among the "ablest" of the group of officers that joined the Staff Corps at that time. He was appointed as a lieutenant in the Australian Imperial Force upon completing his training at Duntroon and embarked from Sydney in January 1919, being sent to the United Kingdom and later posted to France. Returning to the Permanent Military Force as the AIF was demobilised, he later completed his training serving with the British Army in England and India in 1919–20.

Lloyd married Sybil Drummond in Melbourne on 31 December 1921. He subsequently held junior staff and regimental postings in Australia during the 1920s, at the same time studying law at the University of Sydney. His next postings included various adjutant and quartermaster roles at battery and brigade level in the 2nd and 3rd Military Districts. Later he attended Staff College, Camberley, in the United Kingdom during 1932–33. Next he was appointed brigade major of the 4th Divisional Artillery in Melbourne in 1934, and was promoted to major in 1937. He was posted to the Directorate of Artillery at Army Headquarters in Melbourne from 1938 to 1939.

Following the outbreak of World War II in September 1939, Lloyd was seconded to the Second Australian Imperial Force (2nd AIF) for overseas service. He held administrative posts in the 6th Division and I Australian Corps in the Middle East during 1940, but was transferred before the 6th Division went into combat for the first time. In December that year, upon being promoted to the rank of colonel, he was posted to the 9th Division as the senior operational officer, serving as chief of staff to Major General Sir Leslie Morshead. In March, the 9th Division moved into the Western Desert, where they were to finalise their training and prepare to join the British advance through Libya. The landing of German forces around Tripoli in April forced the British and Commonwealth armies into withdrawal from Benghazi as the Afrika Korps arrived to reinforce the Italians in North Africa. The Axis forces subsequently began to advance west towards the strategic port of Tobruk. During the Siege of Tobruk which followed, Lloyd saw action between April and October 1941, until the Australian units were relieved by British forces. Following the evacuation of the 9th Division from Tobruk by sea, Lloyd then served as chief liaison officer at AIF Headquarters, Middle East.

Departing the Middle East in late January 1942, Lloyd was promoted to brigadier and flew to Batavia in the Netherlands East Indies, where elements of the 2nd AIF had been diverted to whilst returning from the Middle East in order to meet the Japanese threat following their initial attacks against British Commonwealth and US forces in the Pacific in December 1941. He subsequently filled a senior staff posting in General Sir Archibald Wavell's ABDA Command during its brief existence, holding the position of Deputy Intendant-General with the temporary rank of major general between January and February 1942. Rising from major to major general in less than two-and-a-half years, he became the youngest general officer in the Australian Army at the age of 42. In this role he acted as Wavell's chief administrative officer; however, he advocated to the Australian high command against British proposals for I Corps to remain in Java, which he believed was unsound and would likely result in its loss given the precarious tactical situation there, and that instead it should be returned to Australia to be concentrated for operations against the Japanese elsewhere. Ultimately, while a few Australian units were landed in Java, where they were inevitably captured in the fighting that followed, the bulk of the 6th and 7th Divisions were returned to Australia after pressure from the Australian government.

Following the Netherlands East Indies campaign, Lloyd returned to Australia in April 1942 and reverted to the rank of brigadier. He was subsequently appointed Director of Staff Duties at Land Headquarters (LHQ) in July. In September he was briefly posted to I Corps in Papua as Brigadier General Staff under Lieutenant General Sir Sydney Rowell. In February 1943, Lloyd was promoted again to major general and appointed Adjutant General at LHQ by the Commander-in-Chief, General Sir Thomas Blamey, remaining in this position until 1946. Blamey had reportedly been "dissatisfied" with the performance of the previous Adjutant General, Major General Victor Stantke, and appointed Lloyd to rejuvenate the office.

Leaving the full-time army, he transferred to the inactive reserve in February 1946. Described by Chester Wilmot as "one of the ablest staff officers and most colourful characters of the AIF", and by Wavell as "a staff officer of great quality", during his service Lloyd had been appointed a Commander of the Order of the British Empire (1941) and was mentioned in despatches three times (1941–42).

== Later life ==
In 1946, Lloyd became a senior executive of the Argus & Australasian newspaper, before unsuccessfully seeking Liberal Party pre-selection for a seat in Federal parliament the same year. In 1948, he was appointed as a member of the government committee that reported on the administration of the British Commonwealth Occupation Force in Japan. His later work included postings as chief of the United Nations Refugee Organisation in Australia and New Zealand (1948–51), and Chief of Mission of the United Nations Korean Reconstruction Agency (1951–53). On return to Australia he took up a position as vice-chairman of Navcot (Aust.) Pty Ltd, a private enterprise which was involved in shipping refugees from Europe as part of the post-war immigration program. Whilst visiting relatives in Western Australia, Lloyd died, aged just 57, of jaundice in the Repatriation General Hospital, in Nedlands, Perth, on 31 May 1956 and was buried in Karrakatta Cemetery. He was survived by his wife, daughter and two sons.
