= Victor Stantke =

British Army general

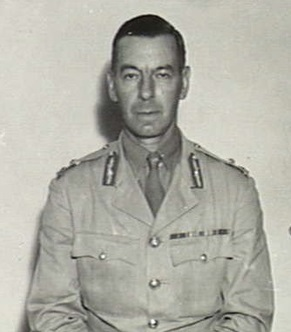
- Major General Victor Stantke in January 1944
- Born: 15 August 1886; Fitzroy, Victoria
- Died: 1967 (aged 80–81)
- Military career
- Allegiance: Australia
- Branch: Australian Army
- Service years: 1911–1946
- Rank: Major General
- Commands: Queensland Lines of Communication Area (1943–46)
- Conflicts: First World War; Second World War
- Awards: Commander of the Order of the British Empire

Major General Victor Paul Hildebrandt Stantke, CBE (15 August 1886 – 1967) was a senior officer in the Australian Army, serving during the First World War and Second World War. His appointments were mainly to staff and administrative postings, including holding the position of Adjutant-General from 1940 to 1943, and commander Queensland Lines of Communication Area from 1943 to 1946.

== Early life and First World War ==
Stantke was born in Fitzroy, Victoria, on 15 August 1886. Educated at the University of Melbourne, he served in the Australian Military Forces as a senior cadet from 1906, and was commissioned through this scheme, reaching the rank of captain by 1909. However, after working as teacher at Brighton Grammar School, in 1911 he relinquished his previous rank and joined the Permanent Military Forces. In the Permanent Force, he was appointed to the Administrative and Instructional Staff (A & I Staff), as a lieutenant, before transferring to the Australian Imperial Force (AIF) during the First World War, and being posted as the adjutant of the 29th Battalion on the Western Front during 1917 and 1918. Promoted to captain, in 1919 he served as Deputy Assistant Adjutant-General, 1st Division before returning to Australia later that year.

== Interbellum and Second World War ==
In the inter-war years Stantke returned to the Permanent Force and as a member of the Australian Staff Corps held various staff and administrative posts. In 1928 Stanke, by then a major, was part of a committee which examined the mechanization of the Australian Military Forces. Later postings included that of Director, Organization and Personnel Services, and Director, Mobilization at Army Headquarters in Melbourne from 1933 to 1935, during which time he was promoted to lieutenant colonel. In 1935 he was made an Officer of the Order of the British Empire. In 1936 and 1937 he undertook training in Great Britain at the Senior Officers' School in Sheerness. From 1937 to 1939 he was posted to the 4th Military District as both the Assistant Adjutant & Quartermaster-General and as Instructional Group Commander, before being posted to same positions in the 2nd Military District in 1939.

Following the outbreak of the Second World War in 1939, he was raised in rank to colonel. In October that year he was appointed Brigadier in Charge of Administration, Eastern Command after temporary promotion to brigadier; however, in June 1940 he took up the position of Adjutant-General, Army Headquarters on promotion to major general, serving in that role until 1943. During this time he directed the assembly of a Court of Inquiry into the circumstances surrounding the events of the Japanese landings in New Britain, Timor and Ambon in 1942, including the subsequent massacre of Australian personnel and civilians at Tol plantation. He also supported proposals which later resulted in the establishment of Directorate of Research and Civil Affairs (DORCA) and of the Australian Army Education Service (AAES). In 1943 he was appointed Commander of the Order of the British Empire. Yet, the Commander-in-Chief, General Sir Thomas Blamey, reportedly had not been "satisfied" with Stantke's performance as Adjutant-General and he was replaced by Major General Charles Lloyd. Blamey had felt that Stantke was "obstructionist and was unwilling to visit forward areas, or even leave Melbourne." Stantke subsequently served as commander of the Queensland Lines of Communication Area during 1943–46.

== Retirement ==
Stantke retired from the permanent forces in 1946. He died in 1967. His funeral was held on 31 May at St Alban's Church of England in Armadale, Victoria and was attended by the then Minister for the Army, Malcolm Fraser. He was cremated at Springvale Crematorium.
