= V Corps Artillery =

- V Corps Shoulder Sleeve Insignia
- Active: 1921–1946; 1950–1975; 1986–2007
- Country: United States
- Branch: United States Army
- Nickname: "Thunderstrike"
- Mottos: Steadfast and Strong
- Decorations: French Croix de Guerre with Palm
- Campaigns: World War II: Tunisia; Sicily; Naples-Foggia; Rome-Arno; Southern France; Rhineland; Central Europe; War on terrorism: Campaigns to be determined

V Corps Artillery was a field artillery formation of the United States Army during World War II, the Cold War, and the early part of the 21st century, sending units to fight in Afghanistan and Iraq. It was officially inactivated in July 2007 at Tompkins Barracks, Schwetzingen, Germany.

== Formation ==
V Corps Artillery's lineage traces back to 13 May 1921 when Headquarters Battery, 13th Field Artillery Brigade, at Camp Bragg, North Carolina, became the artillery headquarters for V Corps. The distinctive unit insignia consisting of a gold shell a pine tree with thirteen branches proper, all within an oval red band bearing the motto "Steadfast and Strong" and in the base a five pointed star in gold was originally approved for the Headquarters and Headquarters Battery, 13th Field Artillery Brigade on 14 Mar 1941. The shell signifies the organization is an Artillery unit. The thirteen branch pine tree alludes to the number of the parent organization – 13th Field Artillery Brigade – while the star refers to the Brigade itself. Red and gold are the colors usually associated with Artillery. It was redesignated for the Headquarters and Headquarters Battery, V Corps Artillery on 28 Jan 1952.

On 2 March 1944, the 76th Field Artillery Brigade from the California Army National Guard was re-designated as V Corps Artillery in preparation for OPERATION OVERLORD, the Normandy invasion, during the Second World War. On 7 June 1944, the first V Corps Artillery elements were ashore on Omaha Beach and V Corps Artillery was in action the following day, firing in support of V Corps units.

== Shoulder sleeve insignia ==
The corps's shoulder patch, a pentagon whose points lie on an imaginary circle 2 1/8 inches (5.4 cm) in diameter whose edges are white lines 3/16 inch (0.48 cm) in width and whose radial lines are white 1/8 inch (0.32 cm) in width, was approved on 3 December 1918. The triangles thus outlined in white are flag blue. The pentagon represents the number of the Corps, while blue and white are the colors associated with Corps flags.

== Operational history ==
=== World War II ===
Upon the breakout from the Normandy hedgerows during Operation Cobra, V Corps Artillery sped across France with V Corps' armored formations. During the autumn of 1944, V Corps Artillery participated in the bloody battle through the Huertgen Forest. During the winter of 1944 and 1945, V Corps Artillery fought with distinction in the Battle of the Bulge, holding the North Shoulder in the Ardennes to defeat Hitler's last major counteroffensive of the war. During the desperate fighting in the Ardennes, V Corps Artillery fired thousands of rounds fused with the VT fuse for the first time in the history of warfare with devastating effect on German infantry and artillery. By the spring of 1945, V Corps Artillery significantly contributed to the conquest of the Third Reich, helping to secure the greatest military victory in the history of the United States.

=== Cold War ===
V Corps Artillery (ten field artillery battalions between two brigades) returned to Germany in 1951 where it trained to defend the Fulda Gap, contributing to the deterrence of Soviet aggression during the Cold War. V Corps Artillery remained forward deployed throughout the Cold War, and continued to be headquartered out of Germany after the fall of the Berlin Wall and the demise of the Soviet Bloc. During the Cold War the command consisted of the 41st and 42nd Field Artillery Brigades.

=== War on terrorism ===
V Corps Artillery entered combat again during the United States invasion of Iraq, firing the initial artillery barrages of the war on 20 March 2003. V Corps Artillery units fired 414 missiles, 857 rockets, and over 18,500 cannon projectiles during major combat operations. The V Corps Artillery headquarters commanded seven artillery brigades during the first year of Operation Iraqi Freedom. For the first time in US military history, V Corp Artillery units fired the Army Tactical Missile System Block 1A and Unitary missiles with devastating effect on elite Iraqi formations, completing the seizure of Iraq within 21 days. V Corps Artillery directed the firing of the Sense and Destroy Armored munitions (SADARM) for the first time in combat during OIF. Throughout the ongoing occupation and civil/military administration of Iraq, V Corps Artillery soldiers ran Combined Joint Task Force 7's Joint Visitors Bureau. Many staff members and soldiers were tasked to support the initial standup of Combined Joint Task Force 7 (CJTF-7) at Camp Victory in Baghdad (On 14 May 2004, CJTF-7 was split into two organizations, Multi-National Force Iraq (MNF-I) and Multi-National Corps Iraq (MNC-I)).

The contributions of V Corps Artillery to CJTF-7 through the Joint Fires and Effects Coordination Cell and Force Field Artillery Headquarters were integral during the initial stages of the war when small arms and mortar attacks were prevalent and improvised explosive device (IED) use had not yet reached the later more significant levels. Additionally, V Corps Artillery led the dangerous mission disposing of over 16,000 tons of enemy munitions as Task Force BULLET in support of counterinsurgency operations in the most ambitious US led nation building scheme in world history. Unfortunately, soldiers were killed and injured during Task Force Bullet as the mission required collecting unexploded ordnance (UXO) of varying degrees of stability from all over Iraq and transporting them to destruction sites. After returning from Iraq the 41st Field Artillery Brigade disbanded in late June 2005, and its last subordinate battalion 1–27 FA (MLRS) was transferred to the 1st Armored Division where it was inactivated the following year.

V Corps Artillery distinguished itself while deployed as a part of Multi-National Corps – Iraq (MNC-I) from 17 January 2006 to 14 December 2006 during Operation Iraqi Freedom (OIF) 05–07. V Corps Artillery performed duties as the Joint Fires and Effects Coordination Cell and Force Field Artillery Headquarters, coordinating hundreds of critical tasks across the Corps' area of operation in pursuit of MNC-I's operational objectives. As the MNC-I Joint Fires and Effects Coordination Cell (JFECC), V Corps Artillery coordinated and synchronized all of the lethal and non-lethal effects across the Corps' lines of operation. The JFECC efficiently performed diverse tasks not associated with the traditional mission set of the field artillery from tracking reconstruction projects and instituting economic reforms to assessing Iraqi governmental control at the provincial level to managing air support requests and coordinating the distribution of close air support assets within theater to initiating and maintaining sensitive dialog with religious and community leaders to conducting information operations to coordinating kinetic operations against key insurgent leaders. VCA redeployed to Germany on 13 December 2006. The VCA received the Joint Meritorious Unit Award for its service from 17 January – 14 December 2006 in Operation Iraqi Freedom 05–07.

== Inactivation ==
In June 2006 the Army formally announced that V Corps Artillery would inactivate as part of the Army Transformation initiative. The Fire Support section would be transferred to the V Corps Headquarters as the interim Fires Directorate. V Corps Artillery inactivated in an afternoon ceremony on Tompkins Barracks on 24 May 2007 and ceased to exist as of 15 July 2007.

== Bibliography ==
- Jim Tice, 3,500 1st AD soldiers to leave Germany in '07, Army Times
- V Corps Artillery History, April 2007
- John McCool, "Interview with MAJ Robert Berg", Combat Studies Institute, Fort Leavenworth, Kansas, 13 January 2006
- Dr. Chris Ives, "Interview with LTC Alfredo Najera", Combat Studies Institute, Fort Leavenworth, Kansas, 24 February 2006
- "V Corps Artillery", GlobalSecurity.org, online worldwide security information compilation
- "V Corps Artillery". Field Artillery. 9 (5). November–December 2004.
- U.S. Army Public Affairs, "V Corps Artillery sergeant recalls surviving brush with terrorism", "Soldier Stories", 23 April 2004
- Patrick J. Sweeney, "Iraq: 101st Division LNO in the V Corps FECC", Field Artillery Journal, July 2003
