= 2nd Light Horse Regiment (Australia) =

- 2nd Light Horse hat badge
- Active: 1914–1919; 1921–1943
- Country: Australia
- Branch: Australian Army
- Type: Mounted infantry
- Size: Regiment
- Part of: 1st Light Horse Brigade
- Engagements: First World War: North African Campaign; Gallipoli campaign; Senussi Campaign; Sinai and Palestine Campaign

Insignia
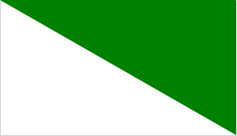
- Unit colour patch

The 2nd Light Horse Regiment was a mounted infantry regiment of the Australian Army during the First World War. The regiment was raised in September 1914, and by December as part of the 1st Light Horse Brigade had moved overseas. During the war the regiment only fought against the forces of the Ottoman Empire, in Egypt, at Gallipoli, on the Sinai Peninsula, and in Palestine and Jordan. After the armistice the regiment eventually returned to Australia in March 1919. For its role in the war the regiment was awarded nineteen battle honours.

== Formation ==
On 18 August 1914, the 2nd Light Horse Regiment was raised at Enoggera, and comprised twenty-five officers and 497 other ranks serving in three squadrons, each of six troops. Each troop was divided into eight sections, of four men each. In action one man of each section, was nominated as a horse holder reducing the regiment's rifle strength by a quarter. Under the command of Lieutenant Colonel Robert Mackay Stodart, its manpower was drawn from the 1st Military District and consisted mainly of residents of Queensland and New South Wales. The regiment's officers had all previously served in the Citizens Forces, and many of its soldiers had also served before, including some who had served in the British forces. All were required to pass a riding test; those that failed were transferred to the infantry and subsequently served in the 9th Battalion. Once formed the regiment was assigned to the 1st Light Horse Brigade, serving alongside the 1st and 3rd Light Horse Regiments.

All Australian Light Horse regiments used cavalry unit designations, but were mounted infantry armed with rifles, not swords or lances, and mounted exclusively on the Australian Waler horse.

== Operational history ==
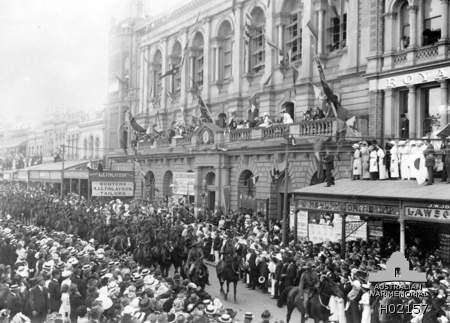
2nd Light Horse Brisbane

=== Departure for Egypt ===
After a short period of training at Enoggera, on 25 September 1914, the regiment left Brisbane, sailing upon the transport ship Star of England, arriving at Egypt on 9 December. There they undertook further training and took part in the North African campaign defending the Suez Canal. In May 1915, they left for the Gallipoli campaign with the Australian and New Zealand Army Corps (ANZAC).

=== Gallipoli ===
The regiment left their horses in Egypt, and arrived at the Gallipoli peninsula on 12 May, joining the Allied forces there as reinforcements. Assigned to the New Zealand and Australian Division, the regiment fought around Anzac Cove, and during the Battle of Sari Bair, but spent most of the campaign in a defensive posture except for one attack they made on the Turkish position at "Quinn's Post" in mid-May, where they lost 25 men killed and 21 wounded before the assault was called off. The regiment left Gallipoli for Mudros, on the island of Lemnos, on 18 December 1915 as part of the Allied evacuation of the peninsula. For their involvement in the campaign, the regiment earned four battle honours.

=== Sinai and Palestine Campaign ===
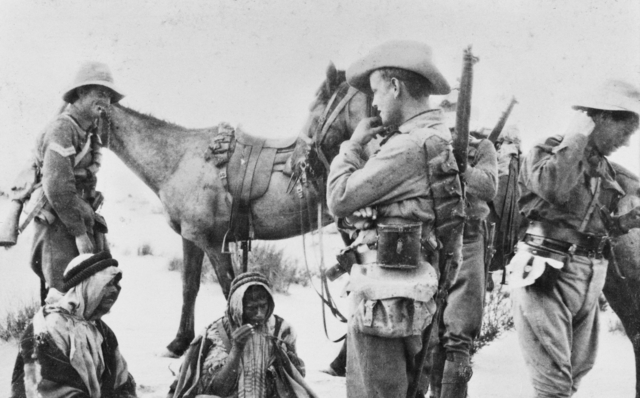
2nd Light Horse patrol at Gererat in the Sinai 1917

After concentrating on Lemnos, the regiment sailed back to Egypt on the transport Ionian on 22 December, spending Christmas at sea. On 27 December, the regiment made port at Alexandria and established a camp at Heliopolis. Back in Egypt the regiment, still with the 1st Light Horse Brigade, became part of the ANZAC Mounted Division, responsible for the defence of the Suez Canal from raiding Senussi Arabs. Then on 4 August 1916, they fought in the Battle of Romani against the Turks, before being withdrawn to rest and refit. The regiment rejoined the brigade in November and took part in the battles of Maghaba and Rafa in December 1916 and January 1917. This was followed by defeat in the second battle of Gaza in April 1917, and the successful Battle of Beersheba and the third battle of Gaza in October and November.

The regiment followed up the retreating Ottoman forces and fought in the battle of Mughar Ridge the battle of Nebi Samwill, the battle of Jerusalem, the battle of Jaffa, the capture of Jericho, the attack on Amman, the attack on Es Salt and finally in September and October 1918 the battles and Megiddo and Nablus.

The Ottoman Empire signed the Armistice of Mudros on 30 October 1918, bring the war to an end. After transferring their horses to the 5th Cavalry Division in late December 1918, the 2nd Light Horse Regiment sailed for Australia on the transport Ulimaroa in mid-March 1919. Sailing via Colombo, Fremantle, Melbourne, and Sydney, the regiment arrived in Brisbane in late April. Due to concerns about an influenza epidemic, they were held in quarantine at Lytton for a week. On 30 April, the regiment marched through the centre of the city, and after the colours were laid up at St John's Cathedral, the regiment was disbanded. Their campaigns in the First World War had cost them 293 men killed and 472 men wounded. A total of 103 officers and 2,508 other ranks served in the regiment during the war.

== Perpetuation ==
In 1921, after the demobilisation of the AIF, the Australian government reviewed the nation's military requirements and the decided to re-organise its part-time military forces to perpetuate the numerical designations of the AIF units. As a result, the 2nd Light Horse was re-formed as a part-time unit in Queensland through the amalgamation of the three Citizens Forces units: the 2nd Battalion, 52nd Infantry Regiment, the 5th Battalion, 9th Infantry Regiment and the 2nd Light Horse (Queensland Mounted Infantry). In 1927, the regiment received its battle honours for the war, and was redesignated as the "2nd Moreton Light Horse (Queensland Mounted Infantry)". It also adopted the motto "Forward".

When it was reformed, the strength of the Citizens Forces units was maintained through a mixture of voluntary and compulsory service; but, following the election of the Scullin Labor government in 1929–1930, compulsory service was discontinued and an all volunteer "Militia" was established. Economic hardship during the Great Depression made it difficult for part-time soldiers to maintain their livelihoods while continuing their training commitments, and as a result the number of volunteers fell sharply. Consequently, a number of units were disbanded or amalgamated. In 1930, the 2nd Light Horse was amalgamated with the 14th West Moreton Light Horse to form the 2nd/14th Light Horse Regiment.

The two regiments remained linked until 1940, when they were split and the 2nd was re-formed in its own right amidst the backdrop of the Second World War. In 1941, it was redesignated the "2nd Reconnaissance Battalion, Moreton Light Horse (QMI)", before later being converted into a cavalry role and changing its name to the "2nd Australian Divisional Cavalry Regiment" the following year. In November 1942, the regiment was designated an "AIF" unit, meaning that they could be deployed outside of Australian territory to fight. Nevertheless, there was little need for cavalry in the jungle battles Australian forces were fighting in the South West Pacific Area and consequently the regiment was disbanded on 29 July 1943. It is perpetuated by the 2nd/14th Light Horse Regiment, which was re-raised in 1949.

== Commanding officers ==
The following officers commanded the 2nd Light Horse during the First World War:

- Lieutenant Colonel Robert Mackay Stodart;
- Lieutenant Colonel Thomas William Glasgow;
- Lieutenant Colonel Sydney William Barlow;
- Major William Ernest Markwell (acting various times 1916, 1917);
- Major Gilbert Birkbeck (acting 1917);
- Lieutenant Colonel George Herbert Bourne

== Battle honours ==
ANZAC · Defence at ANZAC · Suvla · Sari Bair · Gallipoli 1915–1916 · Egypt 1915–1917 · Romani · Magdhaba–Rafah · Gaza–Beersheba · El Mughar · Nebi Samwill · Jerusalem · Jaffa · Jericho · Jordan (Es Salt) · Jordan (Amman) · Megiddo · Nablus · Palestine 1917–1918.
