= 15th Light Horse Regiment (Australia) =

Australian Army regiment

- 15th Light Horse Regiment hat badge
- Active: 1918–1919; 1921–1944; 1948–1956
- Country: Australia
- Branch: Australian Army
- Type: Mounted infantry
- Size: Regiment
- Part of: 5th Light Horse Brigade
- Engagements: First World War: Sinai and Palestine Campaign

Insignia
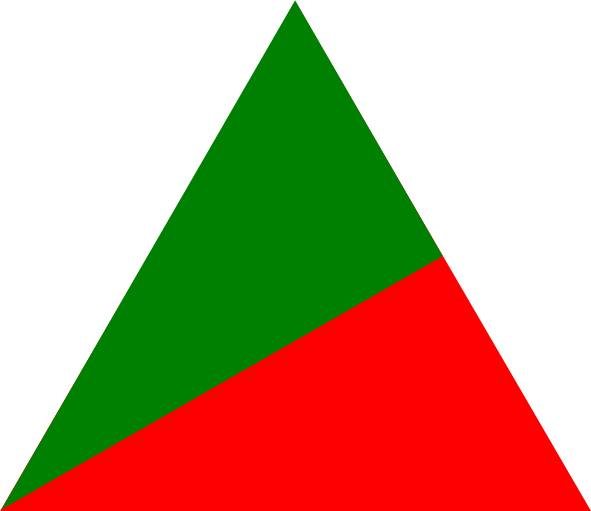
- Unit colour patch

The 15th Light Horse Regiment was a mounted infantry regiment of the Australian Army during the First World War. The regiment was raised in Palestine in 1918, from soldiers that had been serving with the Imperial Camel Corps Brigade, and assigned to the 5th Light Horse Brigade. During the war the regiment fought against the forces of the Ottoman Empire, in the Sinai and Palestine Campaign and was awarded fourteen battle honours. During the inter-war years, the regiment was re-raised as a part-time unit based in the Northern Rivers region of New South Wales. It was later converted to a motor regiment during the Second World War but was disbanded in 1944 without having been deployed overseas. In the post war period, the regiment was briefly re-formed, before being amalgamated into the 1st/15th Royal New South Wales Lancers in 1956.

== Formation ==
The 15th Light Horse Regiment was raised in Palestine in June 1918, from Australian soldiers serving in the disbanded Imperial Camel Corps Brigade, and comprised twenty-five officers and 497 other ranks serving in three squadrons, each of six troops. Each troop was divided into eight sections, of four men each. In action one man of each section, was nominated as a horse holder reducing the regiment's rifle strength by a quarter. The Camel Corps were all trained infantrymen, and some of them had previously served with the Australian Light Horse regiments, but all required a period of training in horsemanship. Once formed, the regiment was assigned to the 5th Light Horse Brigade, alongside a French regiment and the 14th Light Horse Regiment. All Australian Light Horse regiments used cavalry unit designations, but were mounted infantry armed with rifles, not swords or lances, and mounted exclusively on the Australian Waler horse.

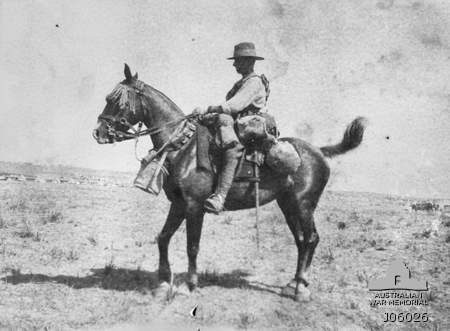
A trooper of the 15th Light Horse Regiment

== Operational history ==
=== Sinai and Palestine Campaign ===
By the time the regiment was ready for service, the war in the Middle East was almost over. The regiment fought in only one major battle at Megiddo in September 1918. Over ten days the 5th Light Horse Brigade advanced 600 kilometres (370 mi) destroying road and rail links, and pursuing the retreating Ottoman Army into Syria. They entered Damascus on 1 October 1918. When the war ended the regiment was recalled to Egypt to assist in policing a riot that had broken out, before returning to Australia. The war cost the regiment sixteen killed and only three wounded, but for their service they were awarded fourteen battle honours, most of them inherited from the disbanded Imperial Camel Corps.

== Perpetuation ==
In 1921, Australia's part-time military forces were re-organised to perpetuate the numerical designations of the AIF following its demobilisation. Through this process, the 15th Light Horse was re-raised as a Citizens Forces unit within the 2nd Military District in the Northern Rivers region of New South Wales, drawing lineage from the 5th Australian Light Horse Regiment (New South Wales Mounted Rifles), which had been formed in 1903. This unit remained in existence throughout the inter-war years, and in December 1941 it was converted into a motor regiment, adopting the designation of the "15th Motor Regiment (Northern River Lancers). In 1942, the regiment was re-designated the "15th Australian Motor Regiment" and was gazetted as an AIF unit, meaning that it could be deployed outside of Australian territory to fight if necessary. Nevertheless, the regiment was deemed surplus to requirements and on 12 October 1944 it was disbanded without having seen operational service during World War II. During the war years, the regiment was variously assigned to the 1st Armoured and 2nd Motor Brigades.

In the post war period, Australia's part-time force was re-raised and in July 1948 the regiment was reformed as a single squadron, with the designation of the "A Squadron, 15th Amphibious Assault Regiment (Northern River Lancers)". The following year it was re-designated the "15th Northern River Lancers". In 1952, the squadron was expanded into a full regiment due to the influx of national servicemen, but in 1956 the regiment was amalgamated with the 1st Royal New South Wales Lancers to form the 1st/15th Royal New South Wales Lancers.

== Battle honours ==
The 15th Light Horse Regiment was awarded the following battle honours:

- Egypt 1915–17 · Romani · Magdhaba-Rafah · Gaza-Beersheba · El Mughar · Nebi Samwill · Jerusalem · Jaffa · Jericho · Jordan (Es Salt) · Jordan (Amman) · Megiddo · Nablus · Palestine 1917–18

== Commanding officers ==
During the First World War, the regiment was commanded by:

- Lieutenant Colonel Arthur James Mills DSO VD
