= 13th Field Regiment (Australia) =

Australian Army field artillery unit

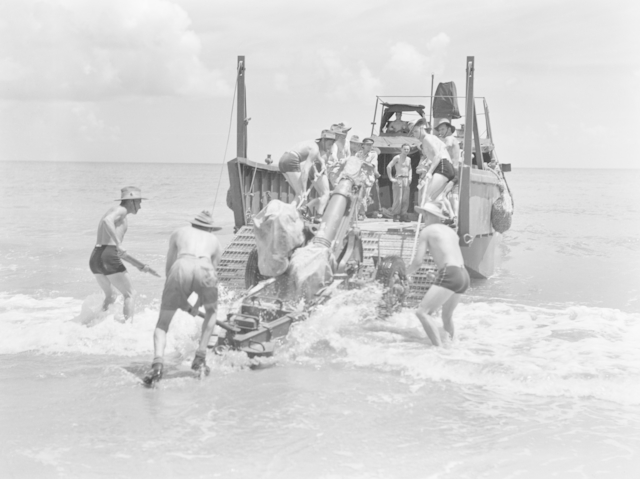
- Gunners from the 13th Field Regiment load a 25-pounder on a landing craft near Cairns, January 1944
- Active: 1916–1975
- Country: Australia
- Branch: Australian Military Forces
- Type: Regiment
- Role: Artillery
- Nickname(s): Mice of Moresby
- Engagements: World War I: Sinai and Palestine Campaign; Western Front; World War II: Battle of Buna–Gona

Insignia
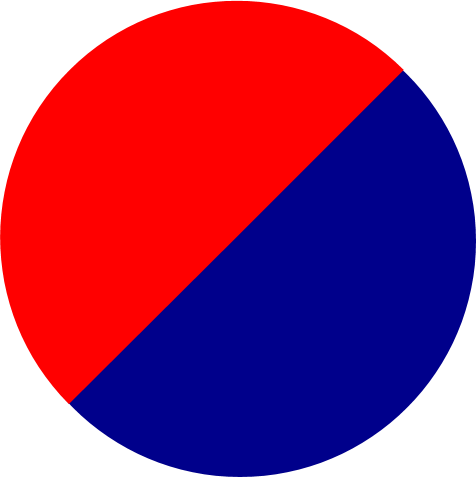
- Unit colour patch

The 13th Field Regiment was an Australian Army artillery regiment. During World War I the unit was formed in early 1916 as the 13th Field Artillery Brigade, and fought as part of the 5th Division in Egypt, the Sinai and on the Western Front. After the war, it was re-raised as a part-time unit based in the state of South Australia. It was redesignated as the 13th Field Regiment during the early years of World War II, and following Japan's entry into the war it was mobilised and later deployed to New Guinea, where a detachment fought during the Battle of Buna–Gona in 1942–1943, returning to Australia in late 1943.

After the war, the regiment was re-formed in 1948 in South Australia and remained in existence until being disbanded in 1975.

== History ==
During World War I, the regiment was designated the 13th Field Artillery Brigade, and was assigned to the 5th Division. Formed in February 1916, it served in Egypt, the Sinai and on the Western Front. Its recruits were mainly drawn from the state of Victoria. After the war, when Australia's part-time military forces were reorganised in 1921 to replicate the divisional structure and numerical designations of the First Australian Imperial Force, the unit was re-raised in South Australia as part of the 4th Military District, adopting the designation of the 13th Field Brigade. It was one of three field brigades assigned to the 4th Division at this time.

In 1940–1941, the regimental system was introduced for militia artillery units, with the previously existing field brigades being redesignated as regiments, and the designation of the 13th Field Regiment was adopted. Following Japan's entry into World War II, the regiment was mobilised as part of the 3rd Brigade. Its component batteries during the early war years were the 48th, 49th, 50th and 113th Field Batteries. The regiment was initially a unit of the AMF, but militia units with more than 75% volunteers could be identified as AIF units, and the 13th was subsequently redesignated as such.

After being mobilised for war service on 15 December 1941, the regiment was moved to Sydney, entraining at Oakbank on 25 December 1941. Embarking on the transport Aquitania at Woolloomooloo two days later, the regiment sailed for New Guinea. Initially they were used in the garrison role, but after the Japanese landed in New Guinea, the regiment became involved in the fighting. During the Battle of Buna–Gona which took place in late 1942 and early 1943, the regiment deployed a troop of four guns under command of Captain N.R. Stokes. These were QF 4.5-inch howitzers. Two of these guns were flown to Dobodura on 20 December. Two were transported by sea and landed at Hariko on 23 December. (Note: Milner gives the arrival of the first two guns as 18 December.) The troop was initially positioned on the Dobodura–Buna track. This was about 2,500 yards (2,200 m) south of the bridge between the two strips. (Note: McCarthy identifies the position of the 1st Mountain Battery as 2,000 yards south of the bridge and the position of the 13th Field Regiment troop a further 500 yards south.) The troop fired in support of the US 32nd Division during fighting at Buna. The troop later moved to a position near Giropa Point to support the Allied attacks to take the final Japanese positions at Sanananda and Giruwa.

The 13th Field Regiment remained in New Guinea until October 1943, when it was withdrawn back to Australia. Throughout 1944, the regiment undertook training on the Atherton Tablelands and was reassigned to the 11th Division. It remained in Australia until the end of the war, when the regiment's personnel were demobilised and the regiment disbanded.

Following the war, Australia's part-time military force was re-raised in 1948 at which time the 13th Field Regiment was re-formed in South Australia. The 48th Battery returned to the 13th Field Regiment's order of battle in June 1966 when the regiment's battery designations were changed. In 1975, the 13th Field Regiment was disbanded and some of its component batteries, such as the 48th, which was based in Adelaide, became independent.

In 1988, the 6th/13th Field Regiment, Royal Australian Artillery was formed by merging the 6th and 13th Field Regiments, but this unit was disbanded in 1997, with its components being absorbed into the 16th and 48th Field Batteries. In mid-2013, these batteries were reduced to troop-sized elements and the 6th/13th Light Battery was formed. In mid-2017, this battery became part of the 9th Regiment, Royal Australian Artillery.
