= 3rd Light Horse Regiment (Australia) =

- 3rd Light Horse Regiment hat badge
- Active: 1914–1919; 1921–1943
- Country: Australia
- Branch: Australian Army
- Type: Mounted infantry
- Size: Regiment
- Part of: 1st Light Horse Brigade
- Engagements: First World War: North African Campaign; Gallipoli campaign; Senussi Campaign; Sinai and Palestine Campaign

Insignia
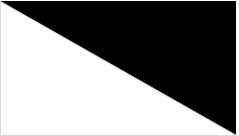
- Unit colour patch

The 3rd Light Horse Regiment was a mounted infantry regiment of the Australian Army during the First World War. The regiment was raised in September 1914, and by December as part of the 1st Light Horse Brigade had moved overseas. The regiment only fought against the forces of the Ottoman Empire, in Egypt, at Gallipoli, on the Sinai Peninsula, and in Palestine and Jordan. After the armistice the regiment eventually returned to Australia in March 1919. For its role in the war the regiment was awarded nineteen battle honours.

During the inter-war years, the regiment was re-raised as a part-time unit based in the state of South Australia. It was later converted to a reconnaissance squadron during the Second World War but was disbanded in early 1943 without having been deployed overseas. In the post war period, the regiment was re-raised as an amalgamated unit, designated the 3rd/9th Light Horse (South Australian Mounted Rifles), which is currently part of the Australian Army Reserve.

== Formation ==
On 17 August 1914, the 3rd Light Horse Regiment was raised in Adelaide, South Australia and in Hobart, Tasmania. It had an establishment of twenty-five officers and 497 other ranks serving in three squadrons, each of six troops. Each troop was divided into eight sections, of four men each. In action one man of each section, was nominated as a horse holder reducing the regiment's rifle strength by a quarter. Once formed the regiment was assigned to the 1st Light Horse Brigade serving alongside the 1st and 2nd Light Horse Regiments.

All Australian Light Horse regiments used cavalry unit designations, but were mounted infantry armed with rifles, not swords or lances, and mounted exclusively on the Australian Waler horse.

== Operational history ==
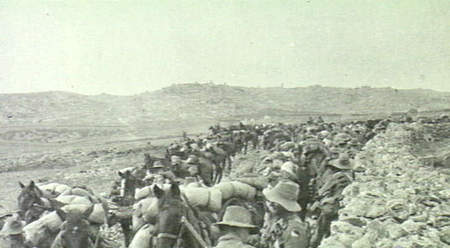
3rd Light Horse Regiment in front of Bethlehem

=== Gallipoli ===
In October 1914, the regiment left Australia, bound for the Middle East. After arriving in Egypt in December, they took part in the North African campaign defending the Suez Canal. They remained there until May 1915, when they left for the Gallipoli campaign with the Australian and New Zealand Army Corps (ANZAC). The regiment left their horses in Egypt, and arrived at the Gallipoli peninsula on 12 May 1915. Here regiment fought in the Landing at Anzac Cove, and the Battle of Sari Bair, but spent most of the campaign in a defensive posture. The regiment left Gallipoli for Egypt in December 1915, by which time they had earned four battle honours.

=== Sinai and Palestine Campaign ===
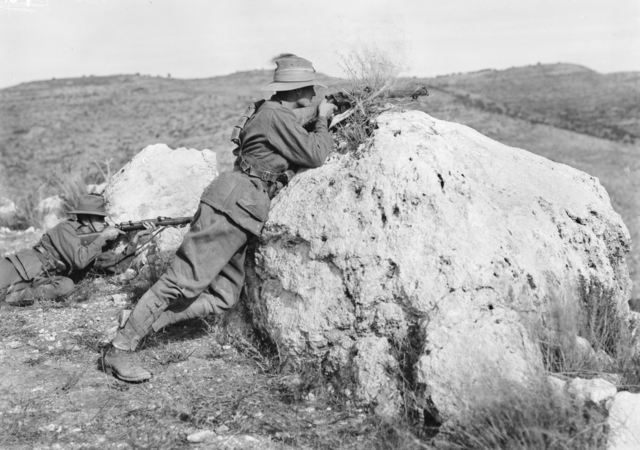
Two snipers from the 3rd Light Horse Regiment

After its return to Egypt, the regiment – along with the rest of the 1st Light Horse Brigade – became part of the ANZAC Mounted Division, and was given responsibility for the defence of the Suez Canal from raiding Senussi Arabs. On 4 August 1916, they fought in the Battle of Romani, before being withdrawn to rest and refit. The regiment rejoined the brigade in November and took part in the battles of Maghaba and Rafa in December 1916 and January 1917. This was followed by defeat in the Second Battle of Gaza in April 1917, and then the successful Battle of Beersheba and the Third Battle of Gaza in October and November.

The regiment followed up the retreating Ottoman forces and fought in the Battle of Mughar Ridge, the Battle of Nebi Samwill, the Battle of Jerusalem, the Battle of Jaffa, the capture of Jericho, the attack on Amman, the attack on Es Salt and finally, in September and October 1918, the Battles and Megiddo and Nablus.

The Ottoman Empire signed the Armistice of Mudros on 30 October 1918, bring the war to an end. No longer required, the regiment sailed for Australia in March 1919 and subsequently disbanded. Their campaigns in the First World War cost them 158 men killed and 653 men wounded.

== Perpetuation ==
In 1921, the decision was made to perpetuate the honours and traditions of the AIF by reorganising the units of the Citizens Force to replicate the numerical designations of their related AIF units. As a result, the 3rd Light Horse was re-raised as a part-time unit based in the 4th Military District, which encompassed the state of South Australia and part of New South Wales. Adopting the designation of the "South Australian Mounted Rifles", it assumed the lineage of several previously existing militia units, including the 22nd Light Horse (South Australian Mounted Rifles) that had been formed in 1912. This unit traced its lineage back to the 16th Australian Light Horse Regiment (South Australian Mounted Rifles), which had been formed in 1903 as part of the amalgamation of Australia's colonial forces into the Australian Army after Federation.

At the outbreak of the Second World War, the 3rd Light Horse was assigned to the 4th Cavalry Brigade, which was part of the 1st Cavalry Division. On 17 December 1941, the regiment was re-organised as a motor regiment, briefly adopting the designation of the 3rd Motor Regiment (South Australian Mounted Rifles). The regiment, with elements of the 9th/23rd Light Horse, was re-designated as the 9th Motor Regiment on 1 January 1942. In early 1943, as the Australian Army undertook a partial demobilisation, the unit was deemed surplus to requirements and was disbanded without having seen operational service during the war.

In the post war period, the regiment was re-raised in 1948 equipped with armoured cars. It was initially designated the 3rd Reconnaissance Regiment (South Australian Mounted Rifles), but the following year it was amalgamated with the 9th Light Horse and re-designated the 3rd/9th Light Horse (South Australian Mounted Rifles). The 3rd/9th remains part of the Australian Army Reserve and is currently part of the 2nd Division.

== Commanding officers ==
The following officers commanded the 3rd Light Horse Regiment during the First World War:

- Lieutenant Colonel Frank Milton Rowell
- Lieutenant Colonel George John Bell
- Lieutenant Colonel David Fulton

== Battle honours ==
The 3rd Light Horse Regiment was awarded the following Battle and theatre honours of the Australian Armys:

- ANZAC · Defence at ANZAC · Suvla · Sari Bair · Gallipoli 1915–1916 · Egypt 1915–1917 · Romani · Magdhaba-Rafah · Gaza-Beersheba · El Mughar · Nebi Samwill · Jerusalem · Jaffa · Jericho · Jordan (Es Salt) · Jordan (Amman) · Megiddo · Nablus · Palestine 1917–1918
