= 48th Field Battery, Royal Australian Artillery =

48th Field Battery
- Active: 6 March 1916 – 2013
- Country: Australia
- Branch: Australian Army
- Role: Field artillery
- Equipment: 81 mm mortar
- Battle honours: Ubique

Commanders
- Current Commander: MAJ Mick Gray, CSM
- Notable commanders: Tom Elder Barr Smith

Insignia
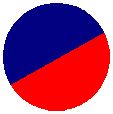
- Unit colour patch

The 48th Field Battery, Royal Australian Artillery was an artillery battery of the Australian Army. The battery traced its lineage back to a unit that was formed for service during the First World War. Assigned to the 9th Brigade, it was located at Keswick Barracks in South Australia until mid-2013 when it was amalgamated with the Launceston-based 16th Field Battery, to form the 6th/13th Light Battery.

== History ==
The 48th Field Battery was formed at Tel el Kebir, Egypt, on 6 March 1916 as part of the expansion of the Australian Imperial Force (AIF) that took place following the end of the Gallipoli campaign during the First World War. Assigned to the 12th Field Artillery Brigade, 4th Division, the battery was transferred to Europe where it saw action in France with the 24th Field Artillery Brigade, employing the Ordnance QF 18 pounder. The battery saw action on the Western Front between June 1916 and January 1917, when it was disbanded.

In 1921, the battery was re-raised as a part-time field artillery unit in South Australia. As part of a wide-scale reorganisation of Australia's part-time military forces that saw units of the Citizens Force adopt the numerical designations of the AIF, the battery was formed from the previously existing 45th Battery that had been established. Under the command of Major H.J. Copley, at this time the battery was mounted on horses and organised into two sections, each consisting of two guns, with a total strength of around 60 personnel. At this time, it was assigned to the 6th Cavalry Brigade's 22nd Australian Field Artillery Brigade, but was attached to the 13th Field Brigade for administration purposes. Initially the battery was manned through the compulsory training scheme, but after this was suspended in 1929, recruitment into the Citizens Force became voluntary.

In 1936, Captain R.J. Harvey took over command of the battery and in 1939 it was relocated to the Torrens Training Depot, where it was co-located with the 10th Battalion. Throughout this time, the battery continued its role as horse artillery. In July of that year, the battery's personnel were used to raise the 51st Battery. The 48th Battery was subsequently re-raised under the command of Captain V.S. Kneebone, shortly after which it relocated to Keswick Barracks.

Following the outbreak of the Second World War, the battery contributed a number of personnel to the Second Australian Imperial Force that was raised for overseas service and, as a result, during the early period of the war, its establishment declined. In late 1941, following Japan's entry into the war, the battery contributed personnel to the 13th Field Artillery Regiment upon its mobilisation. During the first half of 1942, the battery undertook coastal defence duties in South Australia before losing its horses and re-equipping with eight Ordnance QF 25 pounder artillery pieces and moving to Frankston, Victoria. Later in the year, the battery moved to Holsworthy, New South Wales. In December 1942, the battery was gazetted as an AIF unit, which meant that because its personnel had volunteered for overseas service, it could be sent anywhere to fight during the war. In 1943, the battery moved to Queensland before being sent to Port Moresby in New Guinea where it became part of the 13th Field Regiment. They remained in New Guinea until October 1943 when the regiment was withdrawn back to Australia. Throughout 1944, the battery undertook training on the Atherton Tablelands as the 13th Field Regiment was reassigned to the 11th Division. They remained in Australia until the end of the war, when the regiment's personnel were demobilised and the regiment disbanded.

Following the war, Australia's part-time military force was not re-raised until 1948. At this time, the 13th Field Regiment was re-raised in South Australia, but it was not until June 1966 that the 48th Battery returned to the order of battle when the regiment's battery designations were changed. In 1968, the battery was under the command of Captain D.J. Stoba and it was equipped with 25 pounders. These remained the battery's weapon until 1973 when they were replaced by 105 mm pieces. Two years later, the 13th Field Regiment was disbanded and the battery, under the command of Major G.S. Laurie, became independent once more. That year, the battery received four M2A2 pieces to replace some of the L5s.

In 1988, the battery became part of the amalgamated 6th/13th Field Regiment. Following the disbandment of the 6th/13th Field Regiment in 1997, the 48th Field Battery has served as an independent battery under the command of the 9th Brigade. In mid-2013, the battery was reduced to a troop-sized element and amalgamated with the Launceston-based 16th Field Battery to form the 6th/13th Light Battery. Prior to its amalgamation, the 48th Field Battery was a part of the Australian Army's 9th Brigade, located at Keswick Barracks South Australia. It was tasked with providing indirect fire support to 9th Brigade units. In its final years, the battery replaced its six 105 mm M2A2 Howitzers before replacing these with the 81 mm mortar, although a small number of M2A2s were retained for ceremonial purposes.

== Notable members ==
- William Henry Kibby, a recipient of the Victoria Cross, was a member of 48th Field Battery prior to joining the AIF during the Second World War.
