= 14th Light Horse Regiment (Australia) =

- 14th Light Horse Regiment hat badge
- Active: 1860–1930; 1940–1942
- Country: Queensland; Australia
- Branch: Queensland Defence Force; Australian Army
- Type: Mounted Infantry
- Part of: 3rd Division (1916); 5th Light Horse Brigade (1918)
- Engagements: Second Boer War; World War I: Battle of Megiddo
- Battle honours: South Africa 1899–1902, Romani, Magdhaba–Rafah, Egypt 1915–1917, Gaza–Beersheba, El Mughar, Nebi Samwill, Jerusalem, Jaffa, Jericho, Jordan (Es Salt), Jordan (Amman), Megiddo, Nablus, Palestine 1917–1918

Insignia
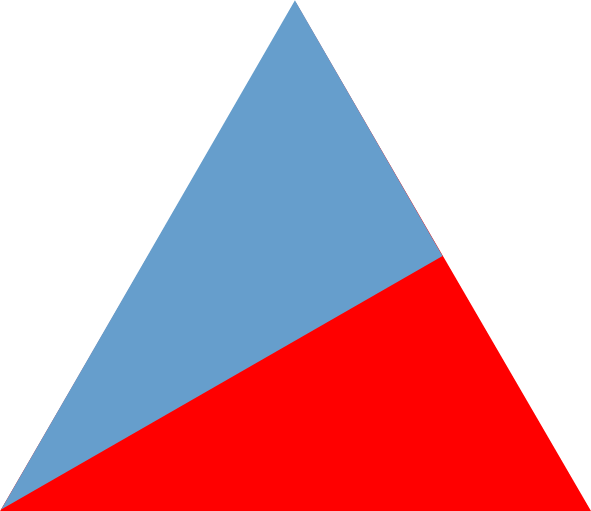
- Unit colour patch

The 14th Light Horse Regiment was a mounted infantry or light horse unit of the Australian Army. The unit takes its lineage from units raised as part of the colonial forces of the state of Queensland in 1860 and served during the Second Boer War and World War I. In 1930 it was amalgamated with the 2nd Light Horse Regiment to become the 2nd/14th Light Horse Regiment (Queensland Mounted Infantry), a unit that continues to exist as part of the Australian Army today.

== Lineage ==
The 14th Light Horse Regiment has a convoluted lineage, (Note: This unit was separate to the 2nd Battalion, Queensland Mounted Infantry which became the 14th Australian Light Horse Regiment in 1903 before subsequently being redesignated as the 3rd Light Horse Regiment in 1913 and then the 11th (Darling Downs) Light Horse (QMI) in 1918. See CMF Light Horse.) having its origins in the 4th Battalion, Queensland Mounted Infantry (QMI), which was a unit of the colonial forces of the state of Queensland that was first raised in 1860. When the Second Boer War broke out, the QMI were sent to South Africa to fight alongside contingents from a number of Australian colonies and it was there that the unit won its first battle honour. (Note: The regiment was officially presented with this battle honour in 1908.) After the Boer War the Australian colonial forces were amalgamated into the military forces of the newly constituted nation of Australia. As a part of this amalgamation the four battalions of the QMI were reformed as light horse regiments, and the 4th Battalion became the 27th Light Horse Regiment.

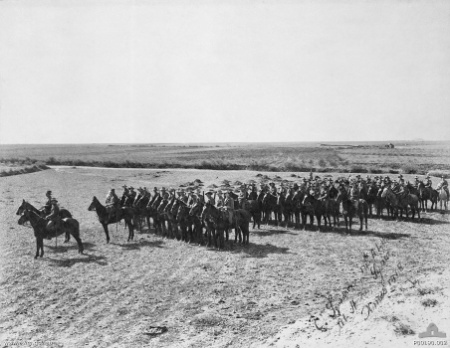
14th Light Horse Regiment on parade at Homs, Syria on Christmas Day 1918

In 1912, a system of compulsory military service was instituted in Australia, the result of which was the expansion of the Army. Consequently, most units of the QMI were redesignated, and the 27th Light Horse Regiment became the 27th Light Horse (North Queensland Light Horse) Regiment. With the outbreak of World War I, due to the provisions of the Defence Act 1903 which did not allow for conscripts to be sent overseas to fight, it was decided to raise an all volunteer force for service overseas; this was designated the Australian Imperial Force (AIF). While the units of the AIF were deployed overseas to Gallipoli and the Western Front, the original units of the QMI remained in Australia on home service.

== Formation and operational history ==
The 14th Light Horse Regiment was raised in March 1916 as part of the AIF at Enoggera, Queensland, attached to the 3rd Division. It departed from Sydney on the steamship Beltana on 13 May 1916, bound for England where it was intended to be brought up to full strength to serve as the 3rd Division's light horse regiment. Before it could be brought up to full strength, however, the establishment was reduced to only one squadron per division and as such only 'A' Squadron was formed. Soon afterwards, however, the divisional establishments of the Australian Army were changed again, this time removing mounted troops from the order of battle altogether. As a result, it was decided to disband the regiment.

In June 1918, the 14th Light Horse Regiment was reformed from the Imperial Camel Corps in Palestine, under the command of Lieutenant Colonel George Langley. This unit had been disbanded due to the unsuitability of the camels to the fighting in Palestine, however, it had performed very well in the previous campaigns in Egypt and the Sinai and had earned a number of battle honours, which the 14th subsequently inherited. Together with the 15th Light Horse Regiment and a French colonial regiment they formed the 5th Light Horse Brigade, attached to the Australian Mounted Division. After their reformation in 1918, the unit adopted their insignia, a triangular colour patch divided diagonally light blue (left) above red, worn on the right shoulder.

The 5th Light Horse Brigade were involved in the fighting against the Turks around Megiddo in September 1918, during which time they suffered eight men killed. Over the course of ten days the brigade advanced more than 650 kilometres (400 mi) before entering Damascus on 1 October 1918, after which they spent the next month performing garrison duties as the brigade prepared to take part in the advance towards Aleppo. Turkey surrendered on 30 October 1918, thus preventing the regiment from seeing any further action during the war. However, before they were to return to Australia they were used to quell the Egyptian Revolution of 1919. They finally embarked for the return voyage to Australia on 24 July 1919.

== Perpetuation ==
After the war, in Australia the units of the QMI underwent another reorganisation when they were renumbered once again. In 1922, the 27th Light Horse (North Queensland Light Horse) Regiment became the 14th (North Queensland) Light Horse Regiment. The AIF was officially disbanded in April 1921 and in the subsequent re-organisation of the Australian Army it was decided that the associated Citizens Military Force units would retain the AIF battle honours. Thus, when the 27th became the 14th in 1922 it was officially given the battle honours of its AIF counterpart. In 1927, the regiment's name was changed again to the 14th (West Moreton) Light Horse Regiment. In 1930, due to economic constraints caused by the Great Depression the 14th was amalgamated with the 2nd (Moreton) Light Horse Regiment to become the 2nd/14th Light Horse Regiment (Queensland Mounted Infantry).

In September 1939, following the outbreak of World War II, the 2nd/14th was assigned to the 1st Australian Cavalry Brigade. In 1940, the 2nd/14th was delinked and the 14th Light Horse Regiment was re-raised as a machine-gun unit. It was assigned to the 4th Australian Cavalry Brigade. Two years later it was renamed as the 14th Motor Regiment, however, it was disbanded shortly afterwards in May 1942 when its personnel were transferred to the 2/4th Armoured Regiment.

== Battle honours ==
- Boer War: South Africa 1899–1902;
- World War I: Romani, Magdhaba–Rafah, Egypt 1915–1917, Gaza–Beersheba, El Mughar, Nebi Samwill, Jerusalem, Jaffa, Jericho, Jordan (Es Salt), Jordan (Amman), Megiddo, Nablus, Palestine 1917–1918. (Note: These battle honours were inherited from the Imperial Camel Corps from where the regiment drew its manpower upon being re-formed in 1918.)

== See also ==
- Colonial forces of Australia
- Military history of Australia during World War I

== Notes ==
Footnotes

Citations
