= 2nd Military District (Australia) =

Administrative district of the Australian Army

Coordinates: 33.8859°S 151.2231°E

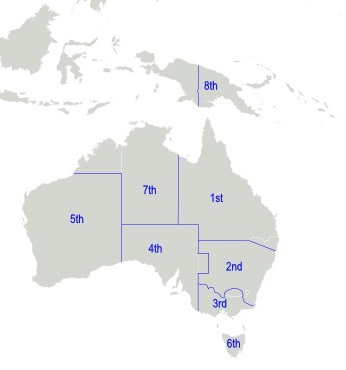
Australian military districts, October 1939

The 2nd Military District was an administrative district of the Australian Army that covered most of New South Wales, with its headquarters in Sydney. The southern border with the 3rd Military District was the Murrumbidgee River rather than the Murray River, and the western part of the state around Broken Hill was part of the 4th Military District.

In March 1939 a regional command structure was adopted, with 2nd Military District becoming Eastern Command and the 5th Military District was redesignated Western Command, while the 1st Military District in Queensland became Northern Command, and the three southern districts, the 3rd, 4th and 6th Military Districts in Victoria, South Australia and Tasmania, were amalgamated into Southern Command. This required legislative changes to the Defence Act (1903), and did not come into effect until October 1939.

== See also ==
- Proposed Japanese invasion of Australia during World War II
