= 6th Military District =

Administrative district of the Australian Army

Coordinates: 42.8887°S 147.3255°E

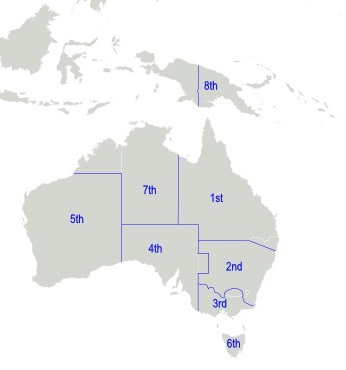
Australian military districts, October 1939

The 6th Military District was an administrative district of the Australian Army. During the Second World War, the 6th Military District covered all of Tasmania, with its headquarters at Hobart.

Around the start of the Second World War, the 6th Military District became part of Southern Command, along with the 3rd and 4th Military Districts in Victoria and South Australia. This required legislative changes to the Defence Act (1903), and did not come into effect until October 1939.

== Units during Second World War ==
=== Headquarters ===
- 6th Military District Headquarters – Anglesea Barracks, Hobart

=== 12th Infantry Brigade ===
- 12th/50th Battalion (The Launceston Regiment / The Tasmanian Rangers) – Launceston
- 40th Battalion (The Derwent Regiment) – Hobart
- 22nd Light Horse Regiment (The Tasmanian Mounted Infantry) – Ulverstone (disbanded 27 April 1943)

=== 6th Field Brigade ===
- 106th Battery, RAA – Hobart
- 16th Field Battery, RAA – Launceston

=== Other units ===
- 7th Heavy Battery, RAA – Hobart
- 107th Heavy Battery, RAA – Hobart
- 6th Fortress Company, RAE – Hobart
- 17th Heavy Battery, RAA – Hobart
- 117th Heavy Battery, RAA – Hobart
- 36th Fortress Company, RAE – Hobart
- 12th Field Company, RAE – Hobart
