= 16th Field Battery, Royal Australian Artillery =

16th Troop, Royal Australian Artillery
- Active: 1860 – present
- Country: Australia
- Allegiance: HM Elizabeth II, Captain-General of the RAA
- Branch: Army
- Type: Artillery
- Role: Light artillery
- Size: 1 artillery troop
- Part of: 9th Regiment, RAA
- Garrison/HQ: Paterson Barracks and Keswick Barracks

Commanders
- Current commander: MAJ Robert Love, BC (Battery Commander, 6th/13th Light Battery)
- Ceremonial chief: HM Elizabeth II

The 16th Field Battery was an Australian Army Reserve unit based in Tasmania with depots at Paterson Barracks in Launceston and Derwent Barracks in Hobart until 2013, when it was reduced in size to a troop, and amalgamated with its Adelaide-based sister battery, 48 Field Battery, to form the 6th/13th Light Battery. The unit is the longest continually serving reserve artillery unit in the Australian Army.

== History ==
The troop traces its history to the Launceston Volunteer Artillery Corps, a volunteer formation raised by the citizens of Launceston on 6 June 1860 under the Tasmanian Colonial government. Following Federation it was handed over to the newly formed Commonwealth and became part of the Citizen's Military Force. Despite numerous increases, reductions and name changes over the years, the Launceston detachment has remained in operation continuously from its formation right through to the present day, and has inhabited the historically significant Paterson Barracks for that entire time.

The unit hosted the artillery range at Stony Head, Tasmania.

16 Troop, along with 48 Troop (based in Adelaide), together constitute the 6th/13th Light Battery, which is now a subunit of the 9th Regiment, Royal Australian Artillery as of 2018; the soldiers continue to wear the RAA hat badge and white lanyard. Like fellow Tasmanian unit 12/40th Battalion Royal Tasmania Regiment (12/40 RTR) it is part of the Adelaide-based 9 Brigade.

Like the rest of 9 Brigade, the unit's force generation cycle is now aligned with that of the Australian Regular Army's 1st Brigade (based in Darwin).

In 2010, the then 16 Field Battery converted from the 105mm M2A2 to F2 81mm Mortars, and this weapon system was inherited by 6/13 Light Battery, which it employs to provide offensive support to 9 Brigade, and in support of 1 Brigade.
