= 3rd Military District (Australia) =

Administrative district of the Australian Army

Coordinates: 37.8274°S 144.9705°E

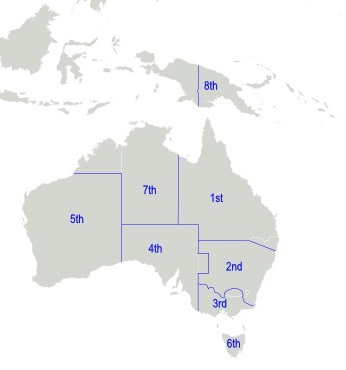
Australian military districts, October 1939.

The 3rd Military District was an administrative district of the Australian Army. The 3rd Military District covered all of Victoria and that part of New South Wales south of the Murrumbidgee River, with its headquarters at Melbourne.

Around the start of the Second World War, the 3rd Military District became part of Southern Command, along with the 4th and 6th Military Districts in South Australia and Tasmania. This required legislative changes to the Defence Act (1903), and did not come into effect until October 1939.
