= 4th Military District (Australia) =

Military district of Australia

Coordinates: 34.94609°S 138.58189°E

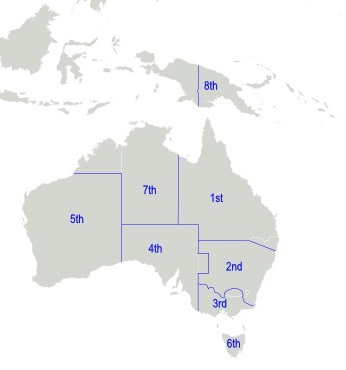
Australian military districts, October 1939

The 4th Military District was an administrative district of the Australian Army. During the Second World War, the 4th Military District covered all of South Australia, with its headquarters at Adelaide. Around the start of the Second World War, the 4th Military District became part of Southern Command, along with the 3rd and 6th Military Districts in Victoria and Tasmania. This required legislative changes to the Defence Act (1903), and did not come into effect until October 1939.

== Units during Second World War ==
=== Headquarters ===
- 4th Military District Headquarters – Adelaide

=== 6th Cavalry Brigade ===
- Headquarters – Keswick
- 3rd Light Horse Regiment (The South Australian Mounted Rifles) – Mt. Gambier
- 9th/23rd Light Horse Regiment (Flinders Light Horse/Barossa Light Horse) – Clare
- 18th Light Horse (Machine Gun) Regiment (The Adelaide Lancers) – Unley

=== 3rd Infantry Brigade ===
- Headquarters – Keswick
- 10th Battalion (The Adelaide Rifles) – Adelaide
- 27th Battalion (The South Australian Scottish Regiment) – Keswick
- 43rd Battalion (The Hindmarsh Regiment) – Adelaide
- 48th Battalion (The Torrens Regiment) – Adelaide

=== 13th Field Brigade ===
- Headquarters – Adelaide
- 49th Field Battery – Adelaide
- 50th Field Battery – Prospect
- 113th (Heavy) Field Battery – Kilkenny
- 48th Field Battery (Attached) – Keswick

=== Other units ===
- 10th Heavy Battery, RAA (PF) – Fort Largs
- 110th Heavy Battery, RAA (M) – Fort Largs
- Detachment, RAE (PF) – Keswick
- 20th Heavy Battery, RAA (PF) – Fort Largs
- 120th Heavy Battery, RAA (M) – Fort Largs
- 3rd Troop, 2nd Field Squadron, RAE – Keswick
- 3rd Field Company, RAE – Keswick
