= 1st Military District (Australia) =

Military district of Australia

Coordinates: 27.468°S 153.028°E

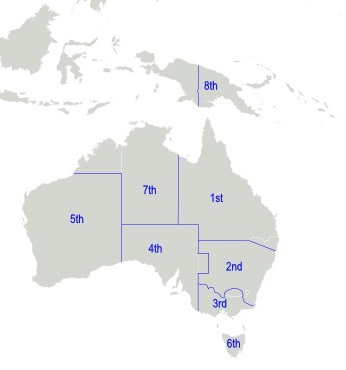
Australian military districts, October 1939

The 1st Military District was an administrative district of the Australian Army. During the Second World War, the 1st Military District covered all of Queensland, with its headquarters at Brisbane.

In March 1939 a regional command structure was adopted, and the 1st Military District in Queensland became Northern Command. This required legislative changes to the Defence Act (1903), and did not come into effect until October 1939.
