= Henry Arthur Goddard =

Australian general

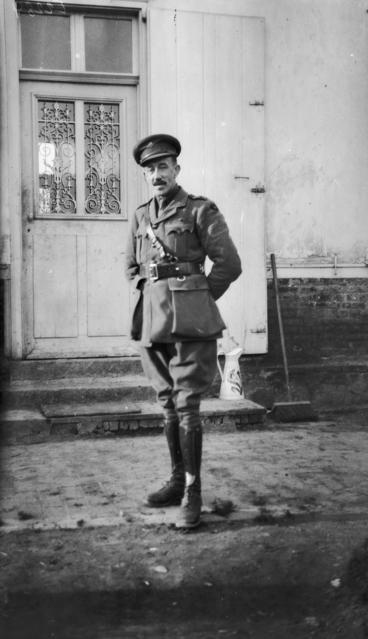
- Lieutenant Colonel Henry Goddard in April 1918
- Born: 13 December 1869; West Hackney, Middlesex, England
- Died: 24 October 1955 (aged 85); Sydney, New South Wales, Australia
- Military career
- Allegiance: Australia
- Branch: Australian Army
- Service years: 1899–1931
- Rank: Brigadier General
- Commands: 14th Brigade (1921–26); 9th Brigade (1918–19); 35th Battalion (1916–18); 17th Battalion (1915–16); 25th Battalion (1915); 7th Infantry (Moreton) Regiment (1913–14)
- Conflicts: First World War; Gallipoli Campaign; Western Front; Battle of Messines; Battle of Broodseinde; First Battle of Passchendaele; First Battle of Villers-Bretonneux; Second Battle of Morlancourt
- Awards: Companion of the Order of St Michael and St George; Distinguished Service Order; Mentioned in Despatches (3); Croix de Guerre (Belgium)
- Other work: Commercial representative of The Times in Australia

Henry Arthur Goddard, CMG, DSO (13 December 1869 – 24 October 1955) was an Australian Army colonel and temporary brigadier general in the First World War.

Born in England, Goddard immigrated to Australia in 1890. He started an importing business and also became involved in the militia, being commissioned into the Queensland Defence Force in 1899. Following the outbreak of the First World War, he joined the Australian Imperial Force (AIF) after being in charge of the defences of Brisbane, where he lived. He commanded an infantry battalion during the Gallipoli Campaign. He suffered health issues and was repatriated to Australia but recovered and was soon serving as commander of the 35th Battalion on the Western Front. He led it through major engagements at Messines, Broodseinde and Passchendaele. During the German spring offensive of 1918 he temporarily commanded the 9th Brigade at the First Battle of Villers-Bretonneux and Second Battle of Morlancourt. He became the brigade's permanent commander in late-May 1918, leading it through to the end of the war. After the war, he returned to the militia, retiring as a brigadier general in 1931. He died in Sydney in 1955.

== Early life ==
Henry Arthur Goddard was born in West Hackney, Middlesex, England on 13 December 1869, the son of an insurance clerk. Goddard migrated to Australia in 1890 and settled in Brisbane. He appears to have worked as a clerk but then started an importing business, which involved extensive travel overseas. He experimented with growing malt barley on the Darling Downs. He was also consul for Paraguay from 1906 to 1915.

As a young man in England, Goddard had been involved in the militia, serving with the Essex Rifle Volunteers. Despite the move to Australia, he remained interested in the military and in November 1899 he was commissioned into the Queensland Defence Force, serving as a lieutenant in the Moreton Regiment. His travels abroad allowed him to observe military manoeuvres in Europe and keep up to date with defence matters. By 1913 he was commander of the Moreton Regiment.

== First World War ==
On the outbreak of the First World War in 1914, Goddard was placed in charge of the defences of Brisbane. In March the following year he joined the Australian Imperial Force (AIF) with the rank of lieutenant colonel. He was given command of the 25th Infantry Battalion, which he anticipated leading in active service overseas but two months later, following a reorganisation of the 2nd Division, he assumed command of the 17th Infantry Battalion. He took charge of the 17th Battalion on 12 May as it boarded the troop ship Themistocles, destined for Egypt.

=== Gallipoli ===
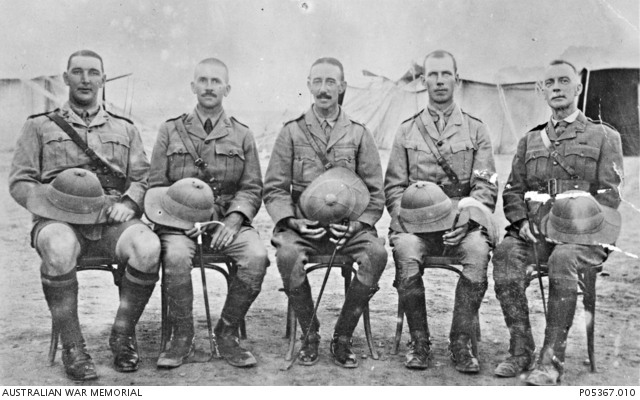
Group portrait of headquarters officers, 17th Battalion taken outside a tent probably in Egypt, 1915. Lieutenant Colonel Goddard, the battalion's commander, is sat in the centre.

The 17th Battalion arrived in Egypt on 12 June 1915, remaining there until mid-August, when it moved to Anzac Cove at Gallipoli. However, Goddard remained in Egypt as he had been hospitalised with stomach trouble. On gaining medical clearance, he left for Gallipoli on the Southland; the ship was torpedoed en route on 2 September. Rescued by a ship of the Royal Navy, Goddard eventually arrived at Gallipoli four days later. At the time, the 17th Battalion was responsible for Quinn's Post, which was an exposed and dangerous position on the Allied line. He remained in command of Quinn's Post until the Anzac position at Gallipoli was evacuated. Suffering from dysentery, he was one of the last to leave Quinn's Post when it was abandoned on 20 December 1915.

When the 17th Battalion arrived at Alexandria on 4 January 1916 after a short period at Lemnos, it proceeded to Tell El Kebir, a training centre for the AIF, four days later. Goddard's health, seriously impacted by the dysentery he had contracted at Gallipoli, was in decline and he was admitted to hospital shortly afterwards. In April, he was repatriated to Australia, arriving there on 18 May.

=== Western Front ===
By July, Goddard had recovered and returned to service with the AIF. He left for the United Kingdom on 1 August, sailing from Melbourne on board HMAT Miltiades, a troop transport. Reporting to AIF Headquarters in London in late September, he was shortly appointed commander of the 35th Infantry Battalion. His new unit was part of the 9th Infantry Brigade, 3rd Division, which at the time was in training on the Salisbury Plain in England.

The 35th Battalion began its service on the Western Front in France in late November, being based in the area around Armentières. In June the following year Goddard led it during the Battle of Messines. It later fought in the Battles of Broodseinde and Passchendaele. On occasions during the second half of 1917 he led the 9th Brigade on an acting basis while its regular commander, Brigadier General Charles Rosenthal, was absent. For his leadership at Messines, Goddard was mentioned in despatches and awarded the Distinguished Service Order (DSO) in the 1918 New Year Honours. The citation for his DSO read:

This officer has commanded his battalion in France since November 1916 and has rendered consistently good service, especially during the period of preparation for the Messines Battle in May 1917, and the actual battle itself in June 1917. He has on four occasions commanded the 9th Australian Infantry Brigade for short periods during the absence of the Brigadier.

Worn out after its efforts at Passchendaele, the 35th Battalion spent the remainder of 1917 and the early part of 1918 in a quiet sector. During the German spring offensive that commenced in late March, the 9th Brigade was moved forward to reinforce the defences in front of Villers-Bretonneux. On 30 March Goddard was ordered to move his battalion to the town to relieve the 61st Division. The size of the sector compromised the battalion's defensive capability so Rosenthal then sent the 33rd Battalion to provide support, delegating Goddard command of all Australian forces in the town. Goddard's headquarters was in Villers-Bretonneux itself, and when the Germans attacked on 4 April to commence the First Battle of Villers-Bretonneux, the Australians withdrew into the town. This placed Goddard's headquarters in the front line. He ordered a counterattack be mounted by 36th Battalion and, with the assistance of British cavalry, was able to hold the line.

At the Second Battle of Morlancourt on 5 May 1918, Rosenthal again delegated Goddard to command of the main portion of the 9th Brigade. After five days of fighting, it was withdrawn. Then, on 21 May, following Rosenthal's appointment to command the 2nd Division, Goddard took over as the commander of the 9th Brigade. Soon afterwards he was promoted to full colonel and temporary brigadier general. He led the brigade at Bray-sur-Somme and the attack on the Hindenburg Line. By the end of the war, he had been mentioned in despatches three times and after the Armistice, was made a Companion of the Order of St Michael and St George (CMG) in the 1919 New Year Honours. He was also awarded the Belgian Croix de Guerre.

== Later life ==
Goddard was repatriated to Australia in January 1920 and was discharged from the AIF a few months later. On return to civilian life, he took up residence in Sydney and resumed his importing business, in which he was joined by his son Horace. He remained involved in the militia, commanding the 14th Infantry Brigade from 1921 to 1926. He was also honorary colonel of the 17th Infantry Battalion, which he had commanded at Gallipoli, and served as president of the Imperial Service Club for a number of years. He was placed on the retired list in 1931 with the rank of brigadier general.

In his later years, he was commercial representative of The Times in Australia. He died at the Concord Repatriation Hospital in Sydney on 24 October 1955, survived by his wife Elizabeth, who he had married in 1897, and two of the couple's three children. His remains were cremated.
