= General Goddard =

General Goddard may refer to:

- George William Goddard (1889–1987), U.S. Air Force brigadier general
- Henry Arthur Goddard (1869–1955), Australian Army temporary brigadier general
- Rick Goddard (fl. 1960s–2000s), U.S. Air Force major general
- General Goddard (ship)
