= First Battle of Villers-Bretonneux =

World War I battle

- Part of Operation Michael (German spring offensive)
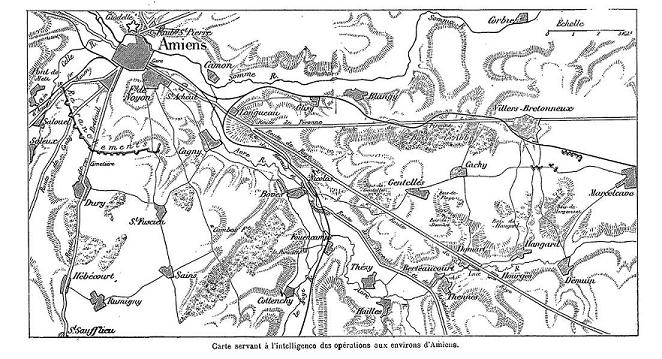
Date	30 March – 5 April 1918
Location	Villers-Bretonneux, Northern France 49°52′03″N 2°31′15″E
Result	British Empire victory

Belligerents
British Empire: Australia; United Kingdom; Canada	German Empire: Bavaria

Commanders and leaders
(Australia) John Monash (Australia) Henry Goddard	(German Empire) Georg von der Marwitz

Units involved
(Australia) 9th Australian Brigade (United Kingdom of Great Britain and Ireland) 6th Battalion, London Regiment (Australia) 15th Australian Brigade (United Kingdom of Great Britain and Ireland) 18th (Eastern) Division (United Kingdom of Great Britain and Ireland) 14th (Light) Division (Canada) Canadian Cavalry Brigade	(Kingdom of Bavaria) 9th Bavarian Reserve Division (German Empire) Guards Ersatz Division (German Empire) 19th Division (German Empire) 228th Division

Strength
Australian 9th Bde: 3500; Other units: unknown	Unknown

Casualties and losses
about 5,000–10,000 dead (Australian and British combined)	8000–10,000 dead (estimated); at least 259 POW (taken by British 18th Division alone).
- Villers-Bretonneux, a commune in the Somme department of northern France

The First Battle of Villers-Bretonneux (30 March – 5 April 1918), took place during Operation Michael, part of the German spring offensive on the Western Front. The offensive began against the British Fifth Army and the Third Army on the Somme and pushed back the British and French reinforcements on the north side of the Somme. The capture of Villers-Bretonneux, close to Amiens, a strategically important road- and rail-junction, would have brought the Germans within artillery-range. In late March, Australian troops were brought south from Belgium as reinforcements to help shore up the line and in early April the Germans launched an attack to capture Villers-Bretonneux. After a determined defence by British and Australian troops, the attackers were close to success until a counter-attack by the 9th Australian Infantry Brigade and by British troops, late in the afternoon of 4 April, restored the line and halted the German advance on Amiens.

== Background ==
In early 1918, following the capitulation of the Russian Empire, the end of the fighting on the Eastern Front allowed the Germans to transfer a significant amount of manpower and equipment to the Western Front. With the general position for the Germans looking weak, the German commander, Erich Ludendorff, decided to go on the offensive. On 21 March 1918, Operation Michael was launched and the attack was aimed at the weakest part of the British lines, along the Somme River. By 5 April, the Germans had gained 37 mi (60 km) of British held territory. Two other operations were launched, one near Armentières, one near Reims. All three operations were eventually halted by the Allies.

== Battle ==
In late March 1918, the German army advanced towards the vital rail-head at Amiens, pushing the British line back towards the town of Villers-Bretonneux. On 29 March, Lieutenant-General John Monash, then commander of the Australian 3rd Division, in Belgium, detached the 9th Australian Infantry Brigade (consisting of four battalions), and sent it south to Villers-Bretonneux, to prevent a breach of the line between the British Fifth Army (General Hubert Gough) and the French First Army (General Marie-Eugène Debeney) that was positioned to the south. On 30 March, the Germans attacked around Le Hamel and although this was turned back, they succeeded in making gains around Hangard Wood. On its left flank, the French First Army fell back, although a counter-attack regained much of the ground.

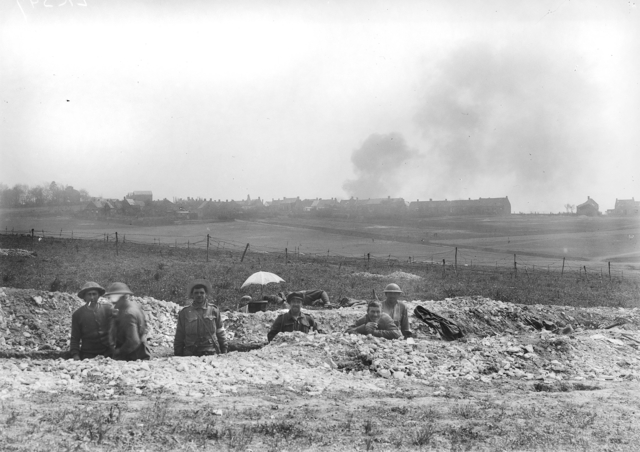
Australian troops near Villers-Bretonneux, 2 May 1918.

Five days later, the Germans renewed their drive towards Villers-Bretonneux, now held by the Australian 9th Brigade, under its acting commander, Colonel Henry Goddard (also commander of the 35th Battalion). From north-west to south-east the line was held by the British 14th (Light) Division, the Australian 9th Brigade and the British 18th (Eastern) Division. The Australians held off the 9th Bavarian Reserve Division and the 18th (Eastern) Division repulsed elements of the Imperial Guards Ersatz Division and Prussian 19th Division.

On 4 April, the British 14th (Light) Division fell back, under pressure from the German 228th Division, around Le Hamel. The 41st Brigade had been pushed back for 500 yd (460 m) "in some disorder" and then retired to a ridge another 3,000 yd (1.7 mi; 2.7 km) back, which left the right flank of the 42nd Brigade uncovered. That same day, however, the line north-west of Le Hamel was reinforced by the arrival of the 15th Australian Brigade. In the afternoon, the Germans resumed their efforts and forced back the 18th (Eastern) Division in the south, at which point Villers-Bretonneux appeared about to fall. The Germans came within 440 yd (400 m) of the town but Goddard, in command of the sector, ordered a surprise counter-attack in the late afternoon, by the 36th Australian Battalion, supported by a company from the 35th Battalion and elements of a British unit serving temporarily as the 9th Brigade's reserve: 6th Battalion, London Regiment (detached from the 58th Division). Flanking movements by the Australian 33rd and 34th Battalions, as well as British cavalry, helped consolidate the Australian gains. Advancing in a staggered series of short rushes, across separate sectors, the Australians and British pushed two German divisions back towards Monument Wood, then north of Lancer Wood and then to retreat from Villers-Bretonneux itself.

== Aftermath ==
=== Analysis ===
Further fighting around the village took place later in the month during the Second Battle of Villers-Bretonneux. The attack on Villers-Bretonneux was the last significant German attack of Operation Michael (known to the British as the First Battle of the Somme, 1918). After the failure of the German forces to achieve their objectives, Ludendorff ended the offensive to avoid a battle of attrition.

=== Casualties ===
The 9th Australian Brigade had 2,400 casualties from c. 3,500 men engaged. German casualties were not known but there were 8,000 to 10,000 losses in two of the regiments engaged. The 9th Australian Brigade recorded 4,000 dead German soldiers on their front and the 18th (Eastern) Division had "severe" losses and took 259 prisoners from the 9th Bavarian Reserve Division, Guard Ersatz Division and 19th Division.
