= John Murray (Australian Army general) =

John Joseph Murray
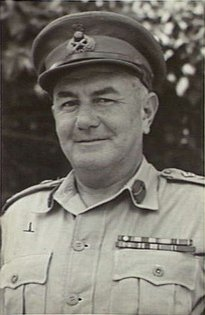
- Major General John Murray at Headquarters First Army in September 1944
- Born: 26 April 1892; Sydney, New South Wales
- Died: 8 September 1951 (aged 59); Concord, New South Wales
- Burial place: Frenchs Forest Bushland Cemetery
- Spouse: Mary Madeline Cannon
- Military career
- Allegiance: Australia
- Branch: Australian Army
- Service years: 1911–1946
- Rank: Major General
- Commands: Northern Territory Force (1945–46); Rear Echelon, First Australian Army (1944–45); 4th Division (1942–44); 10th Division (1942); Newcastle Covering Force (1942); 20th Infantry Brigade (1940–41); Eastern Command Recruit Training Depot (1940); 9th Infantry Brigade (1938–40); Australian Army Service Corps, 1st Division (1934–38); 53rd Infantry Battalion (1930–34); 56th Infantry Battalion (1925–30)
- Conflicts: First World War; Western Front; Battle of Fromelles; Battle of Messines; Battle of the Somme; German spring offensive; Hundred Days Offensive; Second World War; North African campaign; Siege of Tobruk; New Guinea campaign
- Awards: Distinguished Service Order & Bar; Military Cross; Mentioned in Despatches (3); Colonial Auxiliary Forces Officers' Decoration
- Other work: Trade Commissioner to New Zealand (1946–49); Trade Commissioner to Ceylon (1949)

Major General John Joseph Murray, DSO & Bar, MC, VD (26 April 1892 – 8 September 1951) was an Australian Army officer and businessman. He was decorated for his service on the Western Front in France during the First World War, and commanded the 20th Infantry Brigade that played a role in repelling Erwin Rommel's Afrika Korps in Libya during the Second World War.

== Early life ==
Murray was born on 26 April 1892 in Sydney, New South Wales the fourth child of John Murray, an Irish immigrant labourer, and his wife Margaret. He was educated at the local Catholic school before being taken on as an apprentice salesman for Sydney firm Anthony Hordern & Sons in 1910. He then joined the Citizen Military Forces where he did two years service, before joining the 33rd Regiment in 1913.

== First World War ==
Following the outbreak of the First World War, Murray was commissioned as a second lieutenant into the Australian Imperial Force (AIF) on 6 March 1915. Soon after he set sail for Egypt. After initially being posted to the 1st Battalion, in March 1916 he was transferred to the 53rd Battalion, part of the 5th Division, when the AIF was reinforced with fresh recruits from Australia. The 5th Division soon moved from Egypt to France where it was thrust into the brutal fighting of the Western Front.

By 19 July 1916 Murray's 53rd Battalion were involved in the first action that the AIF saw on the Western Front, that of the horrific Battle of Fromelles. Because 5,533 Australian soldiers were killed, wounded or taken prisoner in an operation which was a total failure, the Australian War Memorial describes the battle as "the worst 24 hours in Australia's entire history". Despite the action being a decisive victory for the German Army, Murray was cited for his "courage and tenacity" in leading a charge and holding the position he had captured, and was duly awarded the Military Cross. The citation for the medal reads:

For conspicuous gallantry in action. He led the first two waves of the attack with great dash, and skilfully consolidated the position won. Although outflanked and almost surrounded, he held on to his position with great determination. The success of his battalion was largely due to his tenacity.

Murray was promoted to major in June 1917, and was soon known for his exceptional leadership and daring night raiding of enemy trenches. In September 1918 during the intense fighting of the Second Battle of the Somme, Murray was again cited for his fine leadership, and following clashes near Péronne, he was awarded the Distinguished Service Order, the citation for which reads:

For conspicuous gallantry near Peronne on 1st September, 1918. He led his company with great skill and initiative, and cleared the assembly position, thus allowing the remainder of the battalion to take up its position in time for the attack. Later, while advancing under heavy artillery and machine-gun fire, he led his company through two unbroken belts of wire. Finally, under heavy fire, he supervised consolidation of the ground won, and throughout set a fine example of courage and energy to his men.

Murray was still serving on the Western Front when peace was declared on 11 November 1918. Having been awarded the Military Cross and Distinguished Service Order, and also having twice being mentioned in despatches, he returned home to Australia in May, 1919.

== Between the wars ==
By 25 August 1919 the AIF had been disbanded. Murray returned to his job at Anthony Hordern & Sons in Sydney, though did not withdraw from military life. He returned to his former militia role in the Citizen Military Forces, where his experiences as a commander in the First World War proved valuable.

On 4 January 1923 Murray married Mary Madeline Cannon at St Mary's Cathedral, Sydney. His civilian career began to prosper when he was appointed Manager of the delivery department at Anthony Hordern & Sons.

By 1925 Murray had been appointed to the rank of lieutenant colonel and given command of the 56th Battalion, which he kept until 1930, when he transferred to command of the 53rd Battalion.

Murray enjoyed both his civilian roles, and his military life, and continued to further his career in both. In 1932 he was appointed chairman of the New South Wales Transport Advisory Committee, and he was appointed managing director of Associated Transport Services Ltd in 1935. From 1934 until 1938 Murray was the commanding officer of the Australian Army Service Corps, 1st Division, and he continued to draw his civilian business and military interests more closely together.

== Second World War ==
With war again looming on the horizon, John Murray was given the command of the 9th Infantry Brigade, which mobilised for war in February 1940. Initially he commanded the Eastern Command Recruit Training Depot, but he was appointed to the Second Australian Imperial Force in April and was given command of the 20th Brigade, which sailed for the Middle East in October to begin training in Palestine.

=== Tobruk ===
Murray's 20th Brigade were transferred from the 7th Division to the 9th Division on 9 February 1941. Despite the lack of preparedness, equipment and training, the 9th were thrust into the front in Libya to relieve the 6th Division who were in Tobruk. Murray's 20th Brigade were given the south sector to defend and, by 4 April 1941, Erwin Rommel's elite Afrika Korps met Murray's 20th Brigade at Er Rigima head on. The Australians were able to frustrate Rommel's push, but despite delaying them, Rommel's force was too great to repel, and eventually Murray was forced to withdraw the 20th into Tobruk itself. On 14 April, Rommel tried to press his advantage and take the city, but the 20th Brigade doggedly repelled the Germans, who disastrously suffered heavy casualties. For his leadership that day, Murray was granted a Bar to his Distinguished Service Order.

Murray's experiences of trench warfare and night-raiding proved invaluable to the defenders during the Siege of Tobruk, but at 49 years old, the campaign proved difficult for him to sustain frontline action. In July 1941, Major General Sir Leslie Morshead visited General HQ in Cairo, and Murray had overall command of the fortress. In November 1941, Murray was mentioned in despatches for the third time in his career for his resistance to Rommel.

However, by the end of November General Sir Thomas Blamey visited the besieged garrison, and decided that Murray needed to be withdrawn, feeling his age left him unequal to the demands of modern warfare. Blamey ordered Murray home to Australia where he recommended he be given a recruiting post.

=== Pacific War ===
Murray returned to Australia in January 1942, just in time for Japan's major thrust southwards towards New Guinea. Rather than being given the recruiting desk job that Blamey had earmarked him for, the Australian command placed him in charge of the Newcastle Covering Force, and immediately promoted him to temporary major general.

The Newcastle Covering Force was soon re-designated as the 10th Division. Murray was sent to Western Australia in August 1942 to lead the 4th Division, which was then moved to North Queensland during April to May 1943. In October 1944, he was appointed to command the Rear Echelon of the First Australian Army at Mareeba. He then commanded the Northern Territory Force from March 1945 until January 1946, when he stepped down to the Reserve of Officers, and after 35 years of military service, then resigned from the Australian Army.

== Post war ==
Murray successfully returned to his civilian life after the Second World War and continued to receive appointments, being made Australian trade commissioner to New Zealand from 1946 until 1949 and then trade commissioner to Ceylon briefly in 1949. During this time he wrote of his experience in Tobruk in the book I Confess; a memoir of the Siege of Tobruk, which remained unpublished until 2011. However the demands of two world wars and an exacting career soon caught up with him, and Murray died of haematemesis associated with cirrhosis of the liver on 8 September 1951 at the Repatriation General Hospital, Concord, Sydney. He received a funeral with full military honours, and was buried in Frenchs Forest General Cemetery. His wife, three sons and two daughters survived him.

== Notes ==
Military offices
| Preceded by Brigadier Robert Nimmo (acting) | General Officer Commanding Northern Territory Force; 1945–1946 | Post disbanded |
| Preceded by Major General Jack Stevens | General Officer Commanding 4th Division; 1942–1944 | Post disbanded |
