= 10th Division (Australia) =

1942 Australian Army infantry division

- Active: 15 April – 27 August 1942
- Country: Australia
- Branch: Australian Army
- Type: Division
- Size: Two brigades
- Garrison/HQ: Newcastle, New South Wales
- Engagements: World War II

Commanders
- Notable commanders: John Murray

Insignia
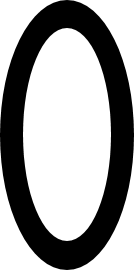
- Headquarters Colour Patch

The 10th Division was a division of the Australian Army, which served briefly during World War II. It was initially formed on 15 April 1942 from the Militia units of the Newcastle Covering Force. However, personnel shortages led to the division being disbanded in August that year.

In 1945, as plans were being made for an invasion of the Japanese home islands, the name 10th Division was revived for a proposed Australian contingent. It was to use personnel drawn from existing units of the Australian Imperial Force. The war ended before the invasion took place and the division was not formally re-raised.

== History ==
=== Formation and disbandment ===
In April 1941, the Newcastle Covering Force was formed, taking over responsibility for the defence of Newcastle from the 1st Division. A Militia formation's main element was initially the 1st, although the 32nd Brigade was raised in January 1942 at Warners Bay, and given control of the elements defending the area south of the Hunter River. The formation was commanded by Major General John Murray. Following the start of the Pacific War in December 1941, the Newcastle Covering Force, was mobilised. After this, its headquarters moved from Fort Scratchley to Broadmeadow. The 1st Brigade was detached and returned to the command of the 1st Division in August 1942 and moved to Greta to undertake a period of training; during this time the 14th Brigade was attached to the force.

The covering force was renamed the 10th Division on 15 April 1942 following a complete re-organisation of the higher command of the Australian Army. The divisional headquarters moved to New Lambton at this time. The 14th Brigade was deployed to Port Moresby in May 1942, and the 1st Brigade returned to the Newcastle Bight. As the situation in New Guinea turned in favour of the Allies, the threat to Australia reduced. This, coupled with personnel shortages, resulted in the Army deciding to disband or amalgamate a number of units. In September, the division was disbanded, along with the 32nd Brigade, and responsibility for the defence of Newcastle given solely to the 1st Brigade.

Australian Prime Minister John Curtin referred to the disbandment of the division in a letter to Winston Churchill in October 1942, saying:

The Army's minimum need for replacement of wastage is 7,000 to 8,000 a month, against an estimated monthly intake in the coming year of 1,100 (youths turning 18). This does not enable existing army formations to be maintained. Eight infantry battalions have already been disbanded and absorbed into other units. This has involved the disbandment of the 10th Division and the absorption of its units into other formations. A further decrease in the number of battalions up to a total decrease of eleven battalions is contemplated.

=== Plans to re-raise ===
Much later in the war, as Allied forces approached the Japanese home islands, planning began for a Commonwealth Corps, including an Australian Imperial Force (AIF) division, to be the re-raised 10th Division. The division was to be made up of experienced personnel from the existing divisions. The corps would have included British and Canadian divisions, and was to be part of a landing on Honshū in 1946. Regardless, the planned landing would have been dominated by US forces, and was known as Operation Coronet.

However, the introduction of the atomic bomb, and its use at Hiroshima and Nagasaki caused Japan to surrender before the invasion took place. As a result, the 10th Division was never re-raised. Instead, the decision was made to raise the 34th Brigade for occupation duties in Japan as part of the British Commonwealth Occupation Force. This formation consisted of volunteers from the three remaining AIF divisions—the 6th, 7th and 9th Divisions.

== Subordinate units ==
- 1st Infantry Brigade (15 April – 27 August 1942)
  - 13th Infantry Battalion
  - 41st Infantry Battalion
  - 2nd Infantry Battalion
- 32nd Infantry Brigade (15 April – 27 August 1942)
  - 33rd Infantry Battalion
  - 8th Garrison Battalion
  - 4th Infantry Battalion (15 April – 1 June 1942)

== Commanding officers ==
- Major General John Murray (6 April – 7 August 1942)
