= 36th Battalion (Australia) =

Australian Army infantry battalion Known as Ike's Marines

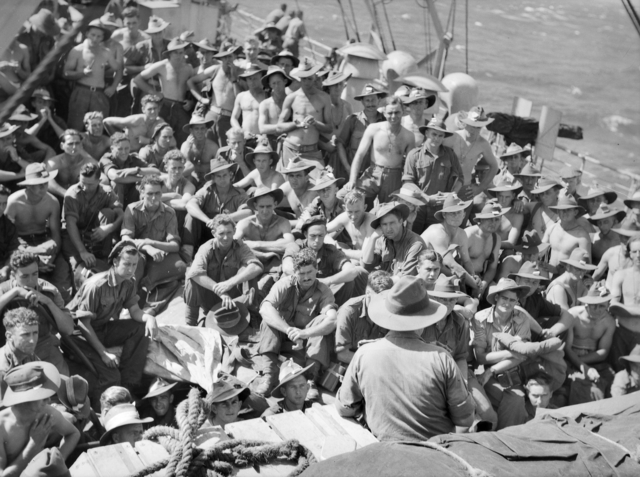
- Members of the 36th Battalion are addressed by their commanding officer on a troopship en route to New Ireland in 1944
- Active: 1916–1918; 1921–1945
- Country: Australia
- Branch: Australian Army
- Type: Infantry
- Size: 800–1,000 men (Note: During World War I the standard size of an Australian infantry battalion was 1,023 men. Later, during World War II it was between 800 and 900 men.)
- Colours: White over green
- Engagements: World War I: Western Front; World War II: New Guinea campaign; New Britain campaign

Commanders
- Notable commanders: Leslie Morshead; Arthur Samuel Allen

Insignia
- Unit colour patch

The 36th Battalion was an infantry battalion of the Australian Army. It was originally raised in 1916 as part of the First Australian Imperial Force during World War I. Throughout World War I the battalion served on the Western Front as part of the 9th Brigade, attached to the 3rd Division. Due to heavy casualties amongst the AIF and a decrease in the number of replacements arriving from Australia in 1918, the battalion was disbanded before the war ended in order to reinforce other units in France. The 36th Battalion was re-raised in 1921 as part of the Militia based in Sydney. During World War II the battalion was attached to the 14th Brigade and was initially used in a defensive role as a garrison unit in Australia before being sent to New Guinea in 1942. The 36th Battalion spent most of the 1942–45 period overseas in New Guinea and New Britain where they undertook operations against the Japanese. In June 1945 they were returned to Australia and shortly afterwards the battalion was disbanded.

== History ==
=== World War I ===
The 36th Battalion was raised at Broadmeadow Camp, in Newcastle, New South Wales, in February 1916 as part of an expansion of the First Australian Imperial Force, which occurred after the Gallipoli Campaign. The bulk of the battalion's recruits came from New South Wales rifle clubs and along with the 33rd, 34th and 35th Battalions, it formed the 9th Brigade, attached to the 3rd Division. The battalion left Sydney shortly on 13 May 1916, bound for the United Kingdom. Arriving in early July 1916, the battalion spent the next four months in training, before taking up a position on the Western Front on 4 December 1916, in time to sit out an uncomfortable winter in the trenches.

Over the course of the next six months the 36th Battalion was mainly involved in only minor defensive actions and it was not until 7 June 1917 the battalion fought in its first major battle, at Messines. After this the battalion participated in the attack on Passchendaele on 12 October 1917. During this battle, the battalion managed to secure its objective, however, as other units had not been able to do so, the battalion had had to withdraw as its flanks were exposed to German counter-attacks and there was a lack of effective artillery support. For the next five months the 36th Battalion alternated between periods of duty manning the line and training or labouring in the rear areas in Belgium, before it was moved south to the Somme to help blunt the German advance during their last-ditch effort to win the war as part of the Spring Offensive of 1918. During this time they were deployed around Villers-Bretonneux in order to defend the approaches to the strategically important town of Amiens, taking part in a counter-attack at Hangard Wood in late March before beating off a concerted German attack on Villers-Bretonneux on 4 April, where the battalion suffered greatly when the Germans attacked with gas.

This was to be the 36th Battalion's last contribution to the war, as it was disbanded on 30 April 1918 in order to reinforce other 9th Brigade units. The earlier campaigns had severely depleted the AIF in France and since 1916 the flow of reinforcements from Australia had slowly been decreasing as the war dragged on and casualties mounted. The refusal of the Australian public to institute conscription had made this situation even worse, and in late 1918 it became clear that the AIF could not maintain the number of units it had deployed in France and it was decided to disband three battalions—the 36th, 47th and 52nd—in order to reinforce others. During its service, the battalion suffered 452 killed and 1,253 wounded. Members of the battalion received the following decorations: one Distinguished Service Order, 11 Military Crosses, three Distinguished Conduct Medals, 34 Military Medals with four Bars, three Meritorious Service Medals, and 13 Mentions in Despatches. In 1927, the 36th Battalion received eight battle honours for its involvement in the fighting on the Western Front.

=== Inter-war years ===
In 1921, the decision was made to perpetuate the battle honours and traditions of the AIF battalions that had served during World War I by reorganising the Citizens Force along AIF lines, with previously existing part-time units adopting the designations of the AIF units that had been recruited in their locations. As a part of this reorganisation the 36th Battalion was re-raised as a part-time Citizens Force unit based at Ashfield, Sydney, on 31 March 1921, based upon the 7th Infantry Regiment (St George's English Rifle Regiment), which had previously served during the Second Boer War. As a result, the new battalion received battle honours from both of these previously existing units. Upon re-establishment, the battalion was commanded by Lieutenant Colonel Arthur Stevens, who had commanded the 2nd Battalion during the war at Gallipoli and on the Western Front. He would remain in command of the battalion until 1926.

The battalion's headquarters was relocated to Haberfield in 1925, and two years later, when territorial titles were adopted in the Militia, the battalion assumed the title "36th Battalion (St George's English Rifle Regiment)". At the same time, the battalion adopted the motto of "St George for Merrie England". In 1929, following the election of the Scullin Labor government, the compulsory training scheme was abolished and in its place a new system was introduced whereby the Citizens Forces would be maintained on a part-time, voluntary basis only. It was also renamed the "Militia" at this time. The decision to suspend compulsory training, coupled with the economic downturn of the Great Depression meant that the manpower of many Militia units dropped considerably and as a result the decision was made to amalgamate a number of units, The 36th Battalion, however, was relatively lucky in that it was not affected by this decision, even though it too suffered from manpower shortages. Notable commanding officers during this time included Leslie Morshead and Arthur Allen, who would both go on to hold positions of higher command during World War II. An alliance with the Worcestershire Regiment was formed in 1930.

=== World War II ===
With the outbreak of World War II, the battalion was called up for a month of continuous service and recruitment was stepped up as national servicemen were used to fill the ranks. During 1940–41, training camps were conducted around New South Wales at Rutherford, Greta, and Bathurst Camps. In March 1942, following the entry of the Imperial Japanese into the war, the 36th Battalion was moved to Newcastle, along with the rest of the 14th Brigade in order to defend against a possible invasion of the area. In May 1942, as the Japanese began to threat New Guinea, they returned to Greta Camp in preparation for transfer to Townsville, from where they would embark for Port Moresby. In Port Moresby, the battalion was initially employed in a garrison role, conducting long-range patrols in the Owen Stanley Range, however, as the Japanese moved further towards Port Moresby, the 36th Battalion was sent to Koitaki in September 1942 in anticipation of going into action. When the Japanese reached Nauro the battalion was sent in as a blocking force, and they patrolled the area along the track that ran south to Subitana for about week before they were moved north to Uberi where they relieved the 2/14th and 2/16th Battalions, before returning to Port Moresby on 9 October 1942. Around this time, the battalion's machine gun company was detached and in conjunction with several other Militia machine gun companies, it was used to form the 7th Machine Gun Battalion.

Despite being withdrawn back to Port Moresby the campaign continued and late in December, the 36th Battalion, now part of the 30th Brigade was sent to Sanananda to take part in the Battle of Buna-Gona. The 16th Brigade had been unable to capture Sanananda initially and so between 19 December and 26 December 1942, the 30th Brigade launched further attacks against the Japanese defences at Sanananda. These too failed, however, and the 36th was transferred from action after being reduced in strength to just 16 officers and 272 men in a fortnight. After only a brief respite, in January 1943 the battalion moved up to the Gona area to relieve the 55th/53rd Battalion and to carry out patrols along the Amboga River. In March, the 36th Battalion was withdrawn from the line and returned to Australia for rest and training. At this time, they received a large batch of reinforcements from the 49th Battalion which had fought alongside them around Sanananda, and in July 1943 they had returned to New Guinea, where for the next fifteen months they would be moved around the island, stationed in Port Moresby, Soputa, Buna–Oro Bay, Lae, Wau, and Bulolo, carrying out various garrison tasks once more.

In October 1944, the 36th Battalion – commanded by Lt Col. Oscar Cedric "Ike" Isaachsen – was assigned to the 6th Brigade and along with the 14th/32nd and 19th Battalions they moved by sea to the north coast of New Britain. Operating on the Gazelle Peninsula, the 36th Battalion took part in the Australian campaign of containment against the much larger Japanese forces that were in existence on the island at the time. In doing so, the battalion made a name for itself carrying out numerous long-range patrols and amphibious landings, becoming known as "Ike's Marines". In June 1945, after seven months on New Britain, the 36th Battalion was relieved and brought back to Australia in June 1945. It was disbanded in August 1945. Throughout its service during the war, the battalion lost 77 killed in action or died on active service, and 126 wounded. Members of the 36th Battalion received the following decorations: one Distinguished Service Order and 14 Mentions in Despatches. Four battle honours were awarded to the 36th Battalion for its involvement in the war in 1961.

== Commanding officers ==
World War I:

- Lieutenant Colonel Marcus Logan.
- Lieutenant Colonel James William Albert Simpson.
- Lieutenant Colonel John Alexander Milne.
- Lieutenant Colonel Harold Fletcher White.

World War II:

- Lieutenant Colonel Arnold Brown.
- Lieutenant Colonel Frederick Alexander Burrows.
- Lieutenant Colonel Oscar Cedric Isaachsen.
- Lieutenant Colonel Muir Purser.

== Battle honours ==
The 36th Battalion held the following battle honours:

- Boer War: South Africa 1901–02; (Note: The battalion inherited the battle honour of "South Africa 1901–02" from the 7th Volunteer Infantry Regiment (St George's Rifles), which sent a contingent of 75 men to South Africa during the Second Boer War.)
- World War I: Messines 1917, Ypres 1917, Polygon Wood, Broodseinde, Poelcappelle, Passchendaele, Somme 1918, France and Flanders 1916–18;
- World War II: South-West Pacific 1941–45, Buna–Gona, Sanananda Road, Liberation of Australian New Guinea.

== See also ==
- Military history of Australia during World War I
- Military history of Australia during World War II

== Notes ==
Footnotes

Citations
