= Rutherford Army Camp =

Rutherford Army Camp was an Australian Army camp near Rutherford, New South Wales, Australia. The camp was established around 1901 and closed in the early 1950s.

== History ==
The camp was initially used for training by the Citizens' Military Forces in the years before the World War I. Training was conducted for units of the First Australian Imperial Force (1AIF), before embarking for overseas deployment. With the end of World War I, the camp remained in use through the inter-war period.

During World War II, the camp was again used for the training of units of both the Second Australian Imperial Force (2AIF) and Citizens' Military Forces militia troops. An accident involving an army truck near the camp on 23 December 1939 resulted in the deaths of four members of the AIF and injured six others. At the start of the war, Rutherford was a training camp for men recruited to the 36th Australian Infantry Battalion.

Throughout its use, the facilities at Rutherford Camp were spartan consisting of tent accommodation. After the cessation of World War II, the camp area was gradually sold off to be resumed as grazing land and closed in the early 1950s.

The 61st Australian Camp Hospital was located at Rutherford Camp. The troops and supplies for the camp were transported by rail and offloaded at the Rutherford Racecourse siding on the Rutherford Racecourse railway line.
