= Newcastle Covering Force =

- Active: 1941–42
- Country: Australia
- Branch: Australian Army
- Role: Fortress
- Size: Brigade +
- Engagements: Second World War

Commanders
- Notable commanders: John Murray

The Newcastle Covering Force was an Australian militia force responsible for protecting the strategically important Newcastle region in New South Wales and its approaches during World War II. Established on 8 April 1941, the formation's composition changed over the course of its existence, starting from a single infantry battalion support by a machine-gun unit and swelling to roughly brigade-size, with a brigade headquarters and three battalions – two infantry and one garrison – supported initially by a machine gun battalion that was later converted to a motor regiment. The unit was responsible for defending the important port and air bases in and around the town, part of Fortress Newcastle, against a feared Japanese invasion. Newcastle Covering Force was converted on 15 April 1942 to the 10th Division, a regular Australian Army unit, following a complete re-organisation of the higher command structures of the Australian Army.

== Units ==
The following units were force assigned to the Newcastle Covering Force:

- 8th Garrison Battalion (11 December 1941 – 2 February 1942)
- 16th Light Horse (Machine Gun) Regiment (2 September 1941 – 14 March 1942)
- HQ 32nd Infantry Brigade (2 February – 15 April 1942)
  - 8th Garrison Battalion
  - 33rd Infantry Battalion
  - 4th Infantry Battalion
- 16th Motor Regiment (14 March 1942 – 29 March 1942)

== Commanding Officer ==
- Major General John Murray
