= 9th Combat Service Support Battalion (Australia) =

Australian Army unit

- Country: Australia
- Branch: Army
- Type: Logistics and Health Support
- Size: Headquarters and four sub-units
- Part of: 9th Brigade
- Garrison/HQ: HQ at Warradale Barracks, Adelaide
- Motto: Deeds not words
- Mascot: Platypus

9th Combat Service Support Battalion (9 CSSB) is a unit of the 9th Brigade of the Australian Army. Originally formed in 1995 as 9th Brigade Administrative Support Battalion (9 BASB), 9 CSSB is a part-time Army (Reserve) unit. The unit is based at Warradale Barracks Adelaide as well as a small sub-unit at RAAF Edinburgh.

== Role ==
The role of 9 CSSB is to provide first and limited second line support to its customer units within the 9th Brigade.
