= Saumarez Homestead =

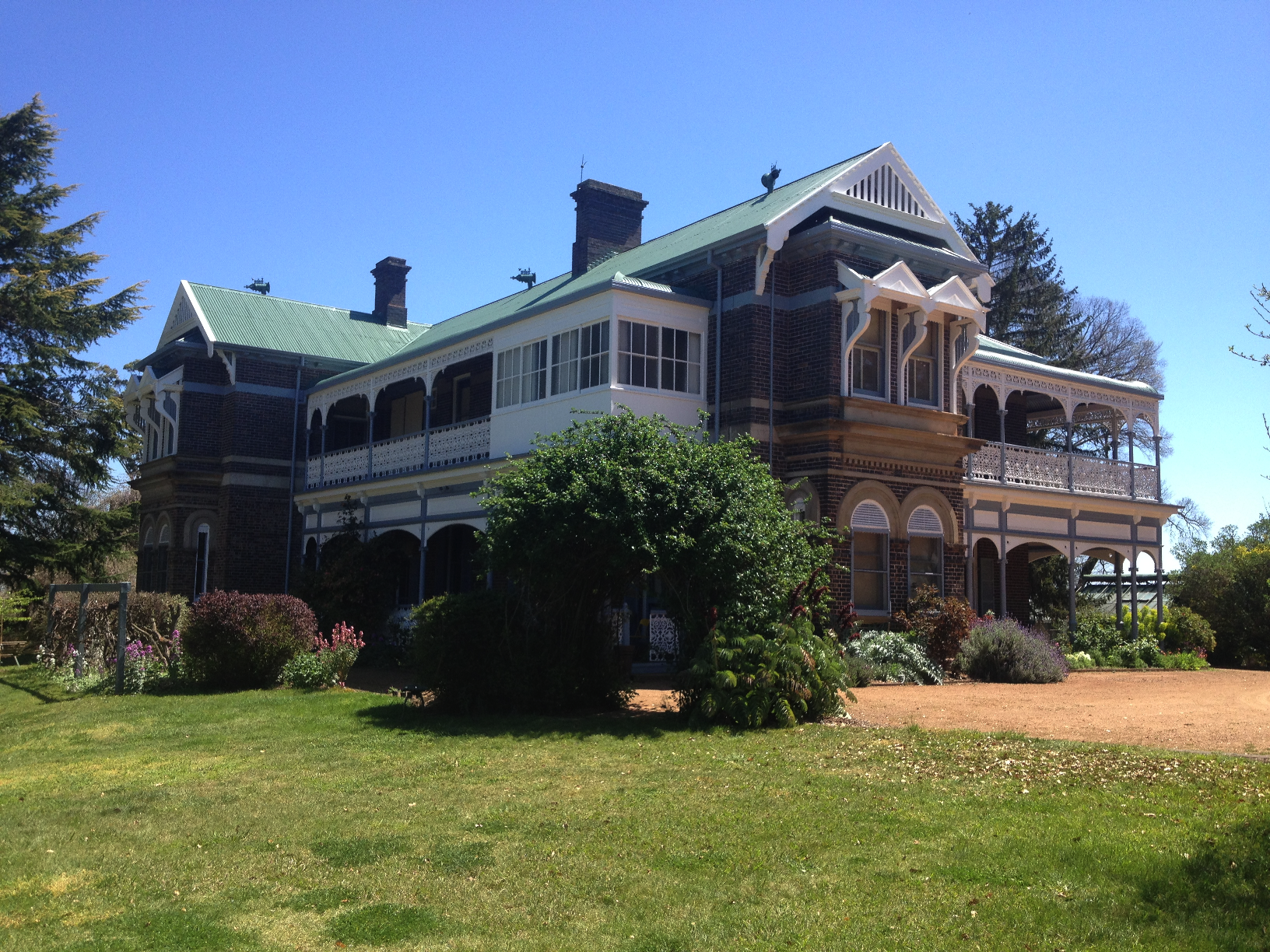
- The main building at Saumarez Homestead

- Location within New South Wales
- Etymology: Saumarez, Channel Islands

General information
- Type: Homestead
- Architectural style: Federation/Edwardian
- Location: 230 Saumarez Road, Armidale, New South Wales, Australia
- Coordinates: 30°32′24″S 151°35′22″E
- Construction started: 1888
- Completed: 1906
- Client: Dumaresq family
- Owner: National Trust of Australia (Trustee)

Technical details
- Grounds: 10 hectares (25 acres)

Design and construction
- Architect: J. W. Pender
- Other designers: Mary White (garden)
- Main contractor: H. E. Elliott

Website
- nationaltrust.org.au/nsw/SaumarezHomestead

New South Wales Heritage Register
- Official name: Saumarez Homestead; Saumarez Homestead; Homestead 'Saumarez; Including Outbuildings; Gardens; Grounds and Driveway
- Type: State heritage (complex / group)
- Criteria: a., c., d., e., f.
- Designated: 1 March 2002
- Reference no.: 1505
- Type: Farm
- Category: Farming and Grazing

Saumarez Homestead is a heritage-listed homestead located at 230 Saumarez Road, Armidale in the Armidale Regional Council local government area of New South Wales, Australia. The homestead was designed by J. W. Pender in the Federation Edwardian style and built between 1888 and 1906 by H. E. Elliott, while the garden was established by Mary White. The property is currently owned by the National Trust of Australia (NSW), who operate it as a museum and function venue. The homestead was added to the New South Wales State Heritage Register on 1 March 2002.

The remaining Saumarez property consists of 10 hectares (25 acres) of land and includes a fully furnished 30-room house, which includes all its original furnishings. There are 15 other buildings dating from 1880 up until 1910, including a cottage, a milking shed, stables, horse yards, a blacksmith's shop and a slaughterhouse, along with collections of farming equipment and other items. The property contains approximately 6,500 household collection items, and a further 3,500 pieces of farming equipment and collection items. It can be rented for weddings and other functions, and has also been used for larger events such as a film festival and fashion shows.

== History ==
Saumarez was formerly the nucleus of a major New England pastoral property. The ten hectares (twenty-five acres) on which the homestead and station buildings stand were subdivided off the continuing Saumarez property of approximately 3,000 hectares (7,400 acres), which are run by pastoralists, the White family.

=== The naming of Saumarez ===
Saumarez, a place name and family name, comes from the Channel Islands, Crown Dependencies of the United Kingdom since the Napoleonic Wars. It was the name chosen by Lieutenant Colonel Henry Dumaresq, whose men and stock first occupied this part of the New England tableland in 1834–35. Both Saumarez and St Ives Heliers, Dumaresq's land grant "St. Heliers", near Muswellbrook in the Hunter Valley, commemorated places and events of significance to the Dumaresq family.

Henry's grandfather, John Dumaresq, was honoured by Britain for his defence in 1781 of St Helier, the capital of Jersey. An earlier John Dumaresq was Seigneur of Saumarez, and this name occurs as a forename in the Dumaresq family. There were also marriages between the Dumaresq and a Guernsey Island family, de Sausmarez, who still live in Sausmarez manor which is open to visitors in Summer. The various spellings of Saumarez have evolved through the centuries but all refer to the Channel Island families and places.

=== The Dumaresq family: 1834–1856 ===
Colonel Henry Dumaresq came to NSW in 1825 as a private secretary to his brother-in-law Governor Darling and in 1833 was appointed Commissioner in charge of the Australian Agricultural Company based at Port Stephens and Stroud. With his brother Captain William Dumaresq, he was responsible for the earliest European settlement of land on the tablelands near the later established town of Armidale when his men with stock and stores were sent beyond the boundaries of official settlement to a region where Aboriginal people had occupied the land for at least 8,000 years.

Henry Dumaresq's head station was established at Saumarez, a squatting run of about 40,000 hectares (100,000 acres) for which he held a A£10 licence from 1837. The run extended from Uralla in the south to north of Mount Duval and covered the area of the Rocky River goldfields.

In 1848 the run carried about 16,000 sheep, 1600 cattle and was run by a staff of about 24 men. The Dumaresq family had built slab houses and huts, a store, yards, woolsheds, washpool and cultivated small paddocks for wheat and oats.

Census data show that the Dumaresq manager on Saumarez in the 1840s had a wife living there, but nothing is known of her name nor origin. The store, at the site of the first homestead, serviced the needs of the resident manager, his shepherds and the surrounding settlers until the township of Armidale was established in 1839.

Gold was discovered at Rocky River on Saumarez in the early 1850s and from that time gold diggers in large numbers flocked to the digging part of the sheep station. After Henry's death in 1838 aged 46, Saumarez was inherited by his widow, Elizabeth Sophia Dumaresq, who held it until 1856 when she sold it to Henry Arding Thomas. Sophia returned to England.

A new book by Ann Philp documents the Thomas and Downes families, whose descendants the Thomases arrived in Sydney in 1852, followed by a sixteen-year residence at Saumarez.

Saumarez was advertised for public auction (in 1857) as: "that splendid property, situate in the District of New England, and well known as the Saumarez Run; is distant only a couple of miles from the Town of Armidale ... the country is rich for pastoral purposes, and there are large tracts of the best agricultural land, the Whole Abundantly Watered ... The Grazing Capabilities may be estimated at 35,000 sheep and 3000 head of cattle ...the Wool has always received the Highest Market Prices. The Improvements on the Head Station are a six-room cottage, kitchen and store detached, 6 stall stable, Barn, Large Woolshed, Garden, well stocked with fruit trees, five men's huts recently built".

=== Henry Arding Thomas: 1856–1874 ===
H.A. Thomas was born in India in 1819, where his father served in the British Army. After pastoral experience at Braidwood and in Queensland, Thomas bought Saumarez from Sophia Dumaresq in 1856. Thomas had married Caroline Husband in 1856 and they came to live in New England at Saumarez where their family of six children were born.

Thomas, his new wife and infant son took possession of the existing buildings on the land near Saumarez Creek, these included the store, a barn, a wool shed and a six-roomed slab cottage. In this initial Saumarez homestead Caroline was to bear seven more infants, although not all of her first eight children survived. Life was hard, although...compared with the living conditions of the small settlers nearby at Saumarez Ponds or those of the wives of Saumarez employees, Caroline's six-roomed house with detached kitchen and laundry, staffed by a male cook and female household help, was almost palatial.

Thomas began his freehold consolidation of Saumarez by applying in 1858 for a homestead block of 337 hectares (832 acres) and two smaller blocks. The large block, upon which Saumarez Homestead now stands was difficult to acquire from the Crown. After application had been made and the block had been duly measured the Government decided to reserve a site for the village of Saumarez at a point where the new Great Northern Road crossed Saumarez Creek. Re-measuring and other difficulties meant that the final sale of reduced block of 303 hectares (749 acres) was not concluded until 1865. Thomas in 1865 made further pre-emptive purchases totalling some 452 hectares (1,118 acres) under the provisions of the Robertson Land Acts and also sought to use the free selection provisions of this act to secure land near the homestead block.

In 1864 all members of his family and some of his employees selected land on Saumarez. Because they could not fulfil the residence requirements these dummy selectors forfeited their deposits and their selections. This however was Thomas' intention as he expected the forfeited land to come to sale at public auction. The Minister for Lands tried to prevent this but Thomas, not to be beaten, had the matter raised in parliament and ultimately the attorney general ruled in his favour. Thomas thus used the letter of the law to acquire an additional 400 hectares (1,000 acres) of Saumarez.

Between 1862 and 1868 Thomas was able to purchase at ordinary auction sales more than 3,600 hectares (9,000 acres) of Saumarez, paying an average slightly over one pound per acre. By 1870 he had consolidated over 4,900 hectares (12,000 acres) and Saumarez was a substantial freehold property. By this time most of the Saumarez run had disappeared: about half had been reserved by the Crown-principally for the Armidale and Uralla Reserves and the Rocky River Goldfield Reserve. Thomas himself had subdivided the old run, forming and selling the new runs of Eversleigh in 1863 and Lindsay in 1865. In its first stage the Saumarez Homestead was sited close to the store, stables and barn, at the working heart of the property. It was typical of the living conditions enjoyed by other hard working and financially established rural property owners.

In due time, largely to house the additional children, Thomas built the three-roomed brick house with surrounding verandahs, which is still standing, adding it to the earlier six-roomed timber slab cottage built by the Dumaresq family. This section has been demolished, although its door, windows, and mantelpiece were probably used in the timber cottage still standing nearby. The whole complex was softened by a developing garden with English trees, reminding Caroline of "home". The Thomas' developed Saumarez's garden. Thomas was a local magistrate, foundation president of the pastoral and Agricultural Society (initiating the first agricultural show on the Northern Tablelands), committee member of the Armidale hospital and involved with Anglican Church affairs. He was sympathetic to the selectors, encouraging closer settlement on land that had previously been occupied by the Saumarez sheep, as former gold diggers turned to farming on its fertile basalt soils.

In 1874 Thomas sold Saumarez to Frank White of "Edinglassie", Muswellbrook and moved closer to Sydney to Wivenhoe near Cobbitty to enjoy a quieter, easier lifestyle as a gentleman farmer. He lived there until his death in 1884 and his wife stayed on until she died in 1903.

=== The White family: 1874–1984 ===
When Frank White, second son of James White of Edinglassie, Muswellbrook, purchased Saumarez from H. A. Thomas he was establishing his family on a property which they have held ever since. Frank died in the following year aged 45 years so that his eldest son, Francis John ('FJ') White was born in 1854 into the second generation of a successful sheep farming family. His father James had been employed 50 years earlier to bring a ship load of sheep to the colony and since that time Frank and his brothers had acquired a prosperous chain of properties extending out from the Hunter Valley. However Frank White died suddenly only months after purchasing Saumarez station and it was his eldest son Francis John (F.J.) White, still a young bachelor, who settled at Saumarez and was left with the responsibility of developing it, at that time a property of less than 8,100 hectares (20,000 acres).

Throughout his life F. J. White built up a valuable rural land holding which included Aberfoil and Bald Blair east of Guyra as well as Saumarez and shares in Queensland and Northern Territory properties. He had close family and business links with his brothers based in the Hunter Valley at Edinglassie, Belltrees, Timor, Segenhoe and Martindale, his uncle F. R. White at Harben Vale, Blandford, Rockwood east of Uralla and at Booloominbah near Armidale.

In 1881 F. J. White married Margaret (Maggie) Fletcher of Orundunby, Walcha and they lived in the Thomas-built (slab hut with brick additions) house where five of their children were born. By 1886 the success of Saumarez wool had enabled F. J. White to pay off the mortgage he had inherited on the Saumarez property and the steady growth of his family prompted him to thoughts of building a larger house. He contracted the Maitland architect, J. W. Pender, to design a house suitable for his family for not more than two thousand five hundred pounds. He chose a site slightly removed from and overlooking the previous stables-stores area.

The new Saumarez homestead was single storey, built of bricks baked on site and completed by May 1888. The Whites chose the date for the family's move into the new homestead as 11 May 1888—their seventh wedding anniversary. It was built by H. E. Elliott of Armidale. It was typical of a nineteenth century large landholders home; but its multiple bedrooms and nurseries and servant accommodation and the smallness of its public rooms stressed its purpose of family comfort rather than an entertainment centre.

The F. J. White family grew with the birth of two more children. Even with a resident cook. Two maids and children's governess/nurse they did not outgrow the single storey house. All seven children spent their childhood there, moving away to school but returning as young adults. Maggie presided over the new Saumarez homestead. She supervised her active family of seven. With the help of several domestic staff and eventually her daughters, she entertained freely and enjoyed comfort and leisure, whilst sometimes chafing under the duties and responsibilities of her role as mistress of Saumarez, until her death there in 1936.

During that long period, apart from the growth of the garden which sheltered the house from the bare, cleared paddocks surrounding it, only one significant change was made to the homestead. Maggie's chief delight was in her garden, already established by the Thomas family, which she extended with standard roses sent up from Sydney and ferns which she gathered along the Saumarez Creek or tree ferns brought back in her husband's saddlebag from the Aberfoil rainforest gullies. In Maggie's time, it was a simple matter to order and obtain plants or furniture from Sydney once the rail link had been established with Armidale in 1883. It was as easy for Maggie to buy from Muswellbrook as from Armidale itself.

By 1890 their family was complete. With her child-bearing years behind her, settled in her comfortable new house, and with the services of a cook, three or four housemaids, a nurse for the children, gardeners to help develop the surroundings of the house, and a driver, Maggie was free for her own social and leisure pursuits. Most entertainment was home-based, relatively simple, and usually took place outdoors. There were family parties, including drives to scenic spots when Frank took time out to take his family for a bush picnic. Bicycle parties were popular in the 1890s. A tennis court was installed in the garden and Maggie held weekly tennis parties. Later, golf became all the rage and many landed families, including the Saumarez Whites, built their own course and held golf parties.

Saumarez's gardens and grounds were laid out when the house was first built (the gardens were planned and constructed at the turn of the 19th century). and by 1913 had reached their present extent. Meanwhile, Saumarez station, linked with other White properties particularly in the production of fine wool, had become a lucrative business. F. J. White, with an established position in the local community, involved himself more and more developing the services of Armidale and district, particularly the Pastoral and Agricultural Society, the hospital and the local schools.

After the death in 1903 of his uncle, Frederick Robert White of Boolomimba, he was called upon to play an even more prominent role. Whilst he avoided what he looked upon as unnecessary show and the time wasting entertainment, his wife was called upon to deputise for him in official duties. Saumarez homestead was known for its hospitality and country entertainment centred on its tennis courts, golf course. Picnic and riding parties presided over by Mrs White and her five daughters. An enlarged Saumarez homestead was needed not so much for an increase in family size but to cater for an increase in family entertainment.

In 1905, while Mrs White and her daughter Joan were on a European tour, F. J. White contacted the original architect J. W. Pender and commissioned him to add another storey to Saumarez homestead, to be completed ready for Mrs White's return in 1906. The new Saumarez, although using the same area as the original house, was a grander house, partly because its size was doubled and partly because of the Art Nouveau flourishes that its architect introduced. It was certainly a more comfortable and more modern house because of the innovations of that F. J. White insisted on for example gas piped throughout for lighting, a hot water system, reticulated water and sewerage, and a heated glass house for the garden. The second storey doubled guest accommodation, provided more servants' rooms and gave the house the rather grand exterior it bears today.

On completion, furnished with engravings and ornaments from Mrs White's overseas visits, lit up by its own acetylene gas plant and set in its established garden of "English" trees and flowers, Saumarez was, if not a rival to the grand houses of Sydney and Melbourne, at least a large and comfortable country family house, a witness to the wealth of big land holders and the flourishing sheep industry of the turn of the century. In size and choice of ornament Saumarez represents on the one hand the profits of a successful pastoralist balanced by the conservative country and family-orientated tastes of its owner.

The homestead remained a family centre long after the children had finished there schooling. One daughter and both sons married before World War I, and both sons remained living close by. The other four daughters continued to live at home and the house continued to be used as a social centre for the family whose hospitality was well known in the Armidale district. In the late twenties the two youngest members, Doris born 1890 and Frank born 1888 died in separate fatal accidents: Doris in October 1926 killed by a car when crossing an Armidale Street, and Frank in June 1930, shot by accident.

Joan (born 1884) and Freda (born 1886) both married and moved away from the district, but returned regularly with their children to stay at the family house. Joan married Gordon Black in 1910 and had a daughter. Harold, the eldest son (born 1883) had married Eva Curtis in 1911. They had two sons, Richard and Graham, and two daughters, Sheila and Francis. After a notable career in World War I, Harold played a leading part in rural affairs, particularly in pastoral improvement in New England, and developed his stud of Angus cattle on his property Bald Blair near Guyra. Freda married John Cullen in 1926 and had two daughters, Jill and Ann.

After Doris' death, her friend Margaret Simpson agreed to give up her own nursing career and take Doris' place in the family at Saumarez. Accepted as a much-loved member of the household, Margaret remained there until her death nearly 30 years later. Her professional nursing of F. J. White, now in his 70s and increasingly crippled by Parkinson's disease, was responsible for making much happier the closing years of his life. The two remaining unmarried sisters, Mary and Elsie also lived on at Saumarez caring for their mother, who spent her final years enjoying the magnificent garden she had (mostly) created. In spite of being handicapped by Parkinson's Disease in later years, F. J. White continued to supervise property and district affairs until his death in 1934, followed by his wife's death in 1936. The eldest daughter, Mary (born in 1882) lived unmarried at Saumarez until her death in 1948, fulfilling a useful role in setting up the first Armidale branch of the Country Women's Association, at several international conferences overseas, and was appointed to the first Council of the New England University College.

Elsie, also unmarried, lived at Saumarez all her long life 1885–1981. She is the family member still remembered by many Saumarez employees, Armidale citizens, Armidale students, friends and acquaintances far from and wide who have experienced Saumarez hospitality. She took over her father's role on his death and insisted on his ides and practices being continued on the property, just as she tried to conserve Saumarez homestead from any radical change. She managed the property and household with interest and efficiency.

The taste and interests of these three spinsters (Margaret, Mary and Elsie) reflected in the house and its furnishings. Much of the chip work woodcarving and some of the tapestry are their work. The pictures and ornaments reflect their taste as much as the conventional style of the period. Their busy, independent and productive lives as the ladies of Saumarez, and their presence ensured that it remained a focal point for the next generation of the family—Frank and Maggie's grandchildren. They—and eventually their children—made frequent visits and spent enjoyable holidays in a much-loved family home. The traditional Saumarez hospitality continued to be afforded—by Miss Mary and Miss Elsie, to their friends and to the citizens of Armidale for many years to come.

The service area at the back of the house, in its size and lack of convenience demonstrates the life-style of the pre-war period when this family was able to depend on servants to maintain the house and provide for guests. Many people have lived and worked in the house. From 1906 until 1939 a cook-housekeeper and two maids lived in, helped by additional non-resident staff to assist with office work, washing, gardening, milking and general maintenance.

A feature of Saumarez is the continuity of employment of several families who lived and worked on the property for several generations. Jack Haynes lived and worked there for over sixty years, as did his brother and son. Two generations of the Yeomans family, two generations of the Bennett family and two generations of the Willis family had long associations with the family. Mr. and Mrs Les Betts are caretakers of the house sixty years after Mr. Bett's father first arrived to work as a rabbiter. Les Betts, his three brothers and a sister in-law have all worked for long periods at Saumarez.

=== National Trust of Australia (NSW), since 1984 ===
Suamarez Homestead at Armidale, set on 10 hectares (25 acres), including house and contents, garden and old farm buildings) was donated to the National Trust in 1984 by descendants of F. J. White. In 1985–86 when the homestead was legally transferred from the ownership of F. J. White & Co. to the National Trust of Australia (NSW), a group of women and men indexed and catalogued every article in the house, collected and collated relevant photographic records, co-opted volunteers and set in place a training scheme for volunteer guides who would interpret the house to the public. The property has been open to the public since the summer of 1985.

Mary's garden was developed by Mary White as a cottage garden in the style of Jocelyn Brown. Fenced off during World War II it was suffocating under blackberries and other weeds until the 1990s when a team of volunteers headed by Alison Affleck started to tackle it. The Vegetable Garden and Orchard are long gone, but the Picking Garden which once supplied the house with a profusion of flowers has been re-established, and is loved by visitors who appreciate its views towards the old squatting runs. The Service Area included rainforest items (plants) collected by F. J. White as he rode the wild gullies of cattle station Aberfoyle. Many found their way into Mrs White's heated conservatory during the severe New England winters. The gardens were much more heavily planted originally and much thinning out has been necessary, as trees and shrubs matured. Many species were pines and all exotics and many of these have died or are reaching the end of their lives. The utilitarian gardens fell into disrepair in the 1970s. The lawns around the house have been constantly maintained. Mary's garden to the south has been partly restored and replanted in recent years by volunteers, providing some indication of its former character, of a picking and flower garden. Funded by the NSW Department of Planning was the upgrading of Jack Haynes Cottage at Saumarez. Garden conservation at Saumarez benefits from detailed records, most of which are archived at the University of New England Heritage Centre. They include a rich photographic collection, F. J. White's letter-books, Saumarez Station work diaries and oral history interviews with long-serving family employees, such as the Betts. The recent digitising and indexing of hundreds of tiny prints from the Saumarez Collection albums will ensure the authenticity and depth of future research and presentations.

In June 2012 Saumarez won the tourism category in the Armidale & District Business Chamber Awards. Income increased by 61 per cent and visitor numbers increased over the 2011–12-year. Property Manager Les Davis, supported by a committee and a small team of staff and volunteers have enhanced and increased visitor experiences and effective marketing to attract new levels and sources of visitation. As well as garden, farm and house tours which have always been a main attraction, Saumarez has considerably increased its range of special tours for adults and school groups. Decorative and Fine Arts Societies have enthusiastically taken advantage of special tours of the fine arts, ceramics, craft and furniture of the main house collection.

Garden conservation at Saumarez benefits from detailed records, most of which are archived at the University of New England Heritage Centre. They include a rich photographic collection, F. J. White's letter-books, Saumarez Station work diaries and oral history interviews with long-serving family employees, such as the Betts. The recent digitising and indexing of hundreds of tiny prints from the Saumarez Collection albums will ensure the authenticity and depth of future research and presentations. The intriguing variety of rare garden heritage at Saumarez is complemented by its colourful bluebells, jonquils, Sparaxis and superb seasonal flowerings of herbaceous paeonies (Paeonia suffruticosa cv.s). The gardens are cared for on a daily basis by a dedicated team of volunteers keen to conserve the heritage character and plantings. Volunteer training weekends over the last two years featured talks by author Anne Philp, a descendant of the White family, who focused on the people who planned the gardens.

The long-abandoned orchard paddock between 2012 and 2015 has been transformed by the Northern (Sub-)Branch of the Australian Garden History Society into a large heritage rose garden displaying many hundreds of rose plants donated by veteran rose collector, Miss Catherine MacLean. The AGHS project was officially opened on 31 October 2015 after a third transplanting of roses the previous winter. The garden was opened by Sue Ebury (patron of the Australian Garden History Society and Countess of Wilton) with the assistance of Adam Marshall (MP for Northern Tablelands), Miss Catherine Maclean, John Atchison OAM (Chair, Saumarez Homestead Advisory Committee and representatives from the National Trust and AGHS. The garden is now open as part of the Saumarez Homestead Garden Tour offered seven days a week.

Saumarez won a 2014 Trip Advisor certificate of excellence, a NSW Government Heritage Volunteer Award and has increased annual visitation from 3,900 in 2009/10 to 8,500 in 2013/14. It won an Armidale Business Chamber Award 2015 for outstanding digital innovation for its development of an App for mobile phones to access history and interpretation data at various points around the property.

=== Modifications and dates ===
Since its completion in 1905, the ground floor verandah valence ironwork moved up to 1st floor balcony, staircase formed in "night nursery", original "sitting room" was enlarged to for the present drawing room, Art Nouveau screen built in drawing room, "scullery" demolished and replaced by the existing one, exterior doorways formed to the staircase, office and cellar, window of room (5) enlarged, washroom (9) formed by construction of the present North Wall, staircase (13) in service wing formed in original "servants" hall, original pantry enlarged by construction of the wall between present pantry (12) and servants, stair, external door and window heads rendered with cement (except those in the service courtyard, Wunderlich ceilings introduced (probably replacing lath and plaster ceilings), iron inserts and tiling in fireplaces added, gas fittings installed which were evidently supplied from a gasometer, plans of which were drawn up by Pender. The location of the gasometer is unknown. The works also involved a hotwater system and reticulated water and sewerage.

The utilitarian gardens fell into disrepair in the 1970s. The lawns around the house have been constantly maintained. Mary's garden to the south has been partly restored and replanted in recent years by volunteers, providing some indication of its former character, of a picking and flower garden.

The following changes have occurred to the house since 1906:

- Exterior timber paint scheme changed to dark brown with beige trim (date unknown)
- electricity installed c. 1928 supplied by on-site generator
- some gas fittings, gasometer and all shades removed, north end of first floor east balcony enclosed late 1920s
- south end of first floor west balcony enclosed 1930s
- ceilings of room 1, 27 and 31 painted (date unknown)
- room (8) decorated in 1960/79's including new fluorescent lights, paint, Vulcan oil heater and television
- ivy removed (1970s)
- fly screens added (date unknown)
- exterior colour scheme changed (date unknown); from brown beige to white and light grey, shutters to first floor removed (prior to present colour scheme)
- covered way from kitchen to dairy/meat room enclosed in timber work (date unknown) and later removed (1970–1980)
- c. 1970 – fitted carpets laid
- 1974 – verandah and balcony floors replaced
- 1930–1950s – bath and lavatory fixtures renewed
- date unknown – Artesse combustion heaters installed (date unknown)
- 1978 – guttering replaced with modern profiles
- date unknown – Aga stove converted from wood to oil and oil tank erected outside kitchen door
- Furniture and furnishings rearranged throughout this time. Pieces added, some removed. Number removed by the White family prior to giving the property to the Trust.
- 2008: Jack Haynes Cottage upgraded.
- 2012–2015: former Orchard Paddock adapted to become Heritage Rose Garden.

== Description ==
The property consists of two distinctive areas:

1. a ridge on which is located the house gardens and
2. a slope leading down from this ridge to Saumarez Creek. On the slope is located the outbuilding complex and the site of the early station homestead. There is no line of sight between the house and the outbuildings.

It is a ten-hectare (twenty-five-acre) grazing property with a 30-room Edwardian mansion, gardens and 15 other farm and other buildings. Mansion has its original furnishings, some 6,500 house collection items, a further 3,500 or so farm collection items, once used and maintained by many hands.

=== Gardens and curtilage ===
There are 2 hectares (4.9 acres) of gardens. By siting the homestead along the top of a ridge it was natural that it be the centerpiece of the landscaped setting reinforced by the landforms. The garden display and recreation areas are arranged to the tree main elevations of the house while the more utilitarian garden areas are set further out to the east or south-east. The garden design is structured to provide a landscaped setting for the important elevations of the homestead as well as giving garden views from each room of the main wing of the house. Saumarez' gardens were much more heavily planted originally and much thinning out has been done as trees and shrubs have matured. Many species were pines and all exotics so that many of these have died or are reaching the end of their lives. Saumarez's gardens and grounds were (re-laid out (as noted above, gardens here pre-existed to the White ownership: Read, pers.comm., 11 December 2014) laid out when the (second) house was first built (the gardens were planned and constructed at the turn of the 19th century and by 1913 had reached their present extent.

The garden has a relatively high proportion of plant material which originated in the Mediterranean, such as: box honeysuckle (Lonicera nitida), winter/lenten roses (Helleborus niger), spurges (Euphorbia characias ssp. veneta), laururstinus (Viburnum tinus), rosemary (Rosmarinus officinalis), "French" lavender, Lavandula dentata, "Italian" lavender (L.stoechas), silver germander (Teucrium fruticans), Algerian iris (I.unguicularis), wormwood (Artemisia abrotanum), soapwort (Saponaria officinalis), sweet violet (Viola odorata), rose campion (Silene coronaria), bladder campion (S.vulgaris), weld (Artemisia sp.), Jerusalem sage (Phlomis fruticosa), rock roses (Cistus spp./cv.s), sweet alyssum (Lobluaria maritima), common ivy (Hedera helix), blue Atlas cedar from Morocco and Algeria (Cedrus atlantica 'Glauca'), Algerian oak (Quercus canariensis), Judas tree (Cercis siliquastrum), daffodils (Narcissus spp./cv.s), grape hyacinth (Muscari armeniacum/botryoides), bluebell (Endymion non-scripta/Scilla campanulata), flag iris (I.germanica cv.s), lamb's ear (Stachys byzantina), holly (Ilex aquifolium), snowflake (Leucojum vernum), white poplar (Populus alba), small-leaved privet (Ligustrum vulgare), hawthorn (Crataegus oxycantha/monocarpa), "Irish" strawberry tree/madrone (Arbutus unedo), winter honeysuckle (Lonicera fragrantissimum) and the shrub Viburnum plicatum.

A variety of flora can be found at Saumarez, including a huge maidenhair tree (Ginkgo biloba), storm-damaged but saved Chinese elm (Ulmus parvifolia), Norway spruce (Picea abies), Caucasian fir (Abies nordmanniana) and, rare for New England, a camphor laurel (Cinnamommum camphora).

Listed as a significant tree by the National Trust on 25 May 2015 and sited to the south-east of the homestead, the Ginkgo biloba is 18m high, 5.4m in circumference (multi-trunk) with a 17-metre (56 ft) canopy spread. Believed to have been planted between 1881 and 1888, it is said to be one of the largest trees of its species in Australia. Identified as Plant no. 23 on a post at its base, it is considered to be significant for its age, physical size and contribution to the landscape of Saumarez House.

The intriguing variety of rare garden heritage at Saumarez, complemented by its colourful bluebells, jonquils, Sparaxis and superb seasonal flowerings of herbaceous paeonies (Paeonia suffruticosa cv.s) make visits a delight. The gardens are cared for on a daily basis by a dedicated team of volunteers, who are keen to conserve the heritage character and plantings. Volunteer training weekends over the last two years featured talks by Anne Philp, a descendant of the White family, who focused on the people who planned the gardens.

Saumarez' gardens are divided into a number of distinct sections.

==== Front Garden ====
The front garden with its aviary and tennis courts included Mrs White's special interest rose garden. Plants were transferred from the original homestead, supplemented by imports from Fergusons' Sydney nursery in 1888.

==== Mary's Garden ====
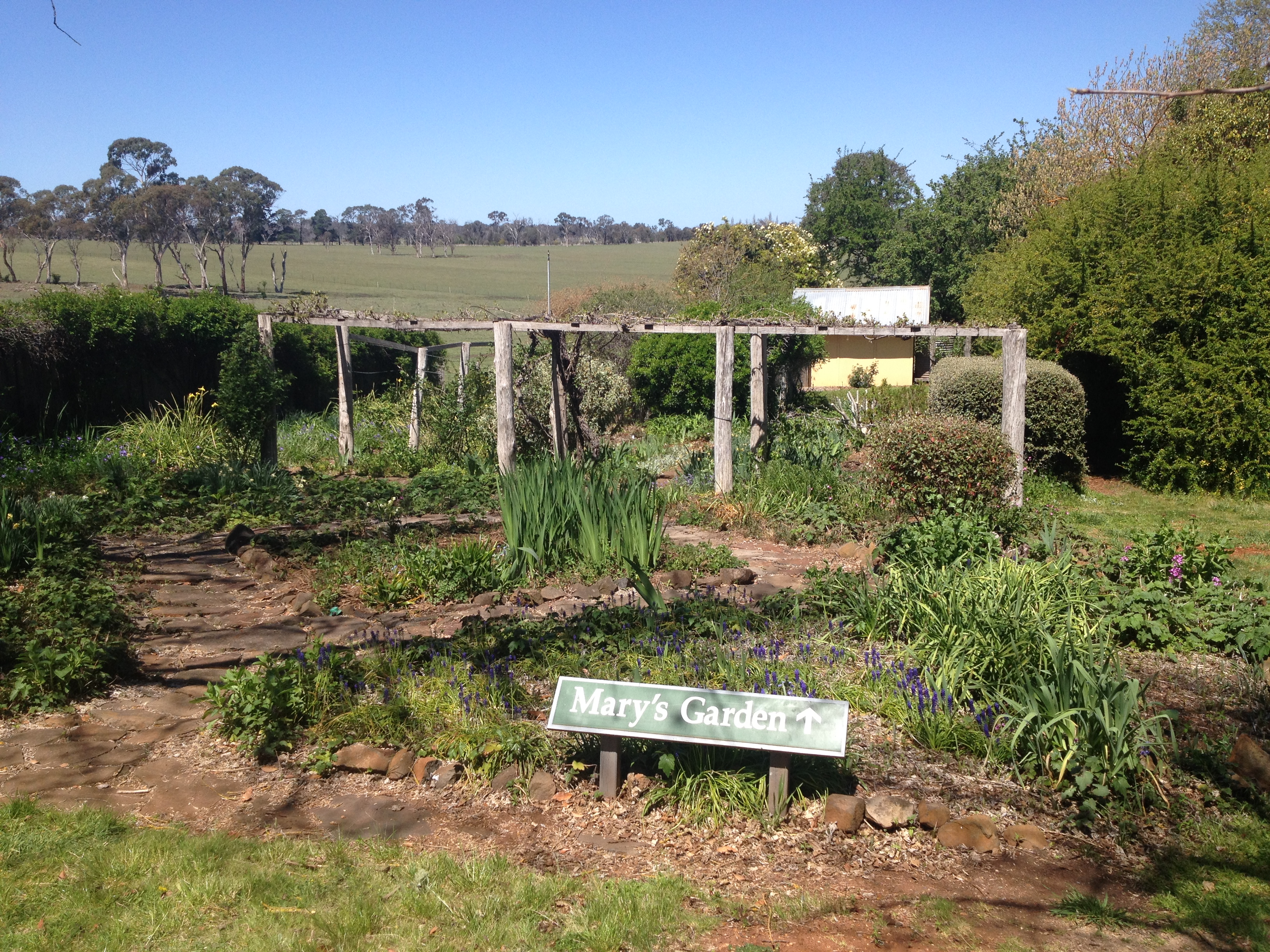
Mary's Garden

Mary's garden was developed by Mary White as a cottage garden in the style of Jocelyn Brown. Fenced off during the second World War it was suffocating under blackberries and (other) weeds until the 1990s when a team of volunteers headed by Alison Affleck started to tackle it.

==== Vegetable Garden, Orchard and Picking Garden ====
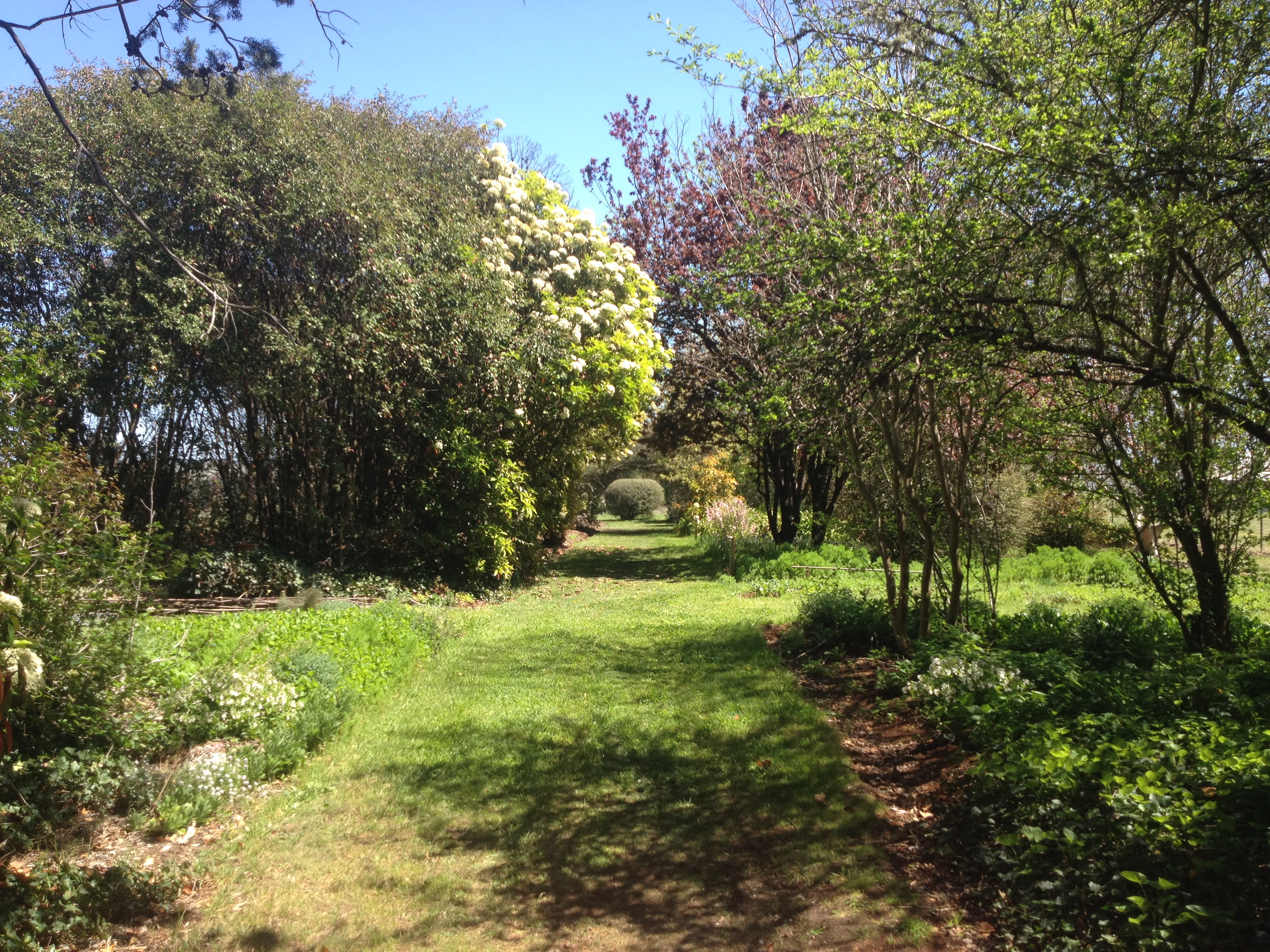
The Picking Garden

The Vegetable Garden and Orchard are long gone, but the Picking Garden which once supplied the house with a profusion of flowers has been re-established, and is loved by visitors who appreciate its views towards the old squatting runs.

Between 2012 and 2015 the former Orchard Paddock was adapted to become a heritage rose garden by the Northern NSW sub-branch of the Australian Garden History Society, housing roses donated by Armidale rosarian, Catherine McLean.

==== Service Area ====
The Service Area included rainforest items (plants) collected by F.J.White as he rode the wild gullies of cattle station Aberfoyle. Many found their way into Mrs White's heated conservatory during the severe New England winters.

==== Orchard Paddock ====
The long-abandoned orchard paddock has been transformed into a large heritage rose garden inspired by the donation of many hundreds of roses donated by veteran Armidale rose collector, Miss Catherine MacLean. The garden was awarded a National Trust Heritage Award in the Conservation (Collections) category in 2016. Some years in the making, the garden opened to the public in October 2015. The garden was and is a collaborative project of the Northern NSW sub-branch of the Australian Garden History Society and the National Trust property. Since late 2015 many dozens of roses have been donated by local garden clubs keen to see all classifications of the rose family represented. When completed, over 500 roses will have been planted, representing each major cultivar group, most of them bred before 1930. Renowned local botanist Ian Telford created the design for 44 concentric beds, based on the idea of a Tudor rose. Local service clubs, Armidale-Dumaresq Council, AGHS and Heritage Roses Australia contributed funding. Visitors are increasing to the property to see the garden, and resultant revenue is helping generate funds to start a second stage, showcasing Australian rose breeders, which is hoped to start in late 2016 (National Trust of Australia (NSW), 2016, 12).

Garden conservation at Saumarez benefits from detailed records, most of which are archived at the University of New England Heritage Centre. They include a rich photographic collection, F.J.White's letter-books, Saumarez Station work diaries and oral history interviews with long-serving family employees, such as the Betts. The recent digitising and indexing of hundreds of tiny prints from the Saumarez Collection albums will ensure the authenticity and depth of future research and presentations.

=== House ===
The structure is a large two-storey brick residence. The elevations are a symmetrical. There are gabled projections on the north- east and west elevations with two storied verandahs between.

The house consists of two sections; a family accommodation wing to the north and a service wing to the south. The latter is built around a courtyard. The family wing contains on the ground floor two large rooms-drawing room and dining room and five smaller rooms used as an office, bedrooms and sitting rooms. It also contains a wash room and bathroom. These front rooms open onto a central hall, while the back rooms open onto a crosshall. An elaborate Edwardian staircase opposite bedroom leads to the first floor.

The first floor plan largely reflects the floor below and contains eight bedrooms, bathroom, a separate lavatory, a linen room and en suite off the main bedroom. On the southern side of the house is the two- storey service wing containing pantry, kitchen, scullery, laundry, and staff dining room and boot room on the ground floor. On the first floor is the present caretaker's accommodation consisting of two bedrooms, sitting room, bathroom, a small kitchen and verandah. Under the pantry and servants stair is a cellar with exterior access. On the east side of the central service courtyard is a single storey wing containing a store and small kitchen.

Walls: The ground floor walls are of Flemish bond brickwork. The bricks are "Armidale Blue". The better face bricks are used on the north and west sides of the accommodation wing. The first floor walls cavity brick in stretcher bond. The first floor bricks are also "Armidale Blue" but have more kiss (firing) marks than those on the lower floor. Sills and thresholds appear to be of Ravensfield stone while window head mouldings and string courses are cement rendered.

In the service courtyard the ground floor window and door heads have been painted imitation tuck-pointed brickwork. Over the upper bay windows are elaborate twin gabled bracketed timber hoods. The windows below at ground level have louvred panels set into the arched heads.

Internally the walls are of plaster. They are either painted or wallpapered except in the bathrooms where they are partially tiled and in the service wing where they are all painted. Corners of all walls are finished with timber staff moulds.

Roof: This is sheeted in corrugated iron and is hipped in form with gables above the bay windows. These gables have vertical battens below the barge decoration. These decoration covers a circular vent formed in the brickwork. The verandah iron has a bull-nose profile. The eaves are decorated with paired timber brackets and all guttering is of galvanised iron or splayed aluminium profiles. There are some ogee rainwater heads. There are revolving roof vents on the ridges.

Floors: These are generally of timber covered by a central carpet square or runner with a linoleum border. There are fitted carpets to rooms 2,7,8 and 11. The bathroom floors are of encaustic tiles and the verandah floors of untreated timber. The latter have been removed with the exception of the first floor west balcony. This floor is badly weathered and the outer edge has traces of a bituminous coating.

Ceilings: All ceilings to the accommodation wing are of Wunderlich pressed metal. Each room and section of hallway has a different pattern. These patterns are picked out in various colours with the exception of those rooms 1,27 and 31. The major rooms 1,8,11,31 have central ceiling roses. Minor rooms have no roses. The service wing has timber ceilings.

Doors, windows and joinery: These appear to be all of cedar and all painted externally. There are timber louvred shutters to the ground floor French doors and windows. The first floor French doors and windows are not shuttered but have traces of shutters (hinges and catches). There are timber-framed flyscreens to the exterior doors and to internal openings between rooms 8 and 56 and between rooms 11 and 12. The French door leaves have a single pane of glass. The windows consist of two single pane double hung sashes.

Interior doors are generally four-panelled. The exterior doors from the office4, staircase 57 and cellar 14 have been formed after the original ground floor construction. The bricks around their openings correspond to those on the first floor walls.

Joinery is attained and varnished on the ground floor with the exception of the drawing room1, which is painted. All the first floor joinery is painted. There is an ornament rail to rooms 23 and 27 while all remaining rooms have picture rails. Generally all glazing is clear with the following exceptions: front door fanlight and sidelights have coloured art nouveau lead-light world; drawing room 1 exterior door fanlight has coloured art nouveau lead-light work: the first floor stair hall window contains large panels of etched glass with Flannel lower, gymea lily and waratah decorations; the first floor external hall door is etched with flannel flower and waratah decorations.

The main arched openings of the hallways are decorated with plaster architrave's, panelling and plaster caps whilst the first floor halls have pedestal and key stones.

Verandah and balconies: The two main front verandahs and balconies are of similar detail consisting of Ionoc-derived iron ground floor posts stamped "Simpson- Makers-Morpeth" with timber panelled frieze and arched valances above. The upper floor column capitals are of corinthian design. The east verandah is enclosed by a cast iron balustrade and gates, all of which have timber cap The ceilings of the verandahs are elaborately panelled in timber around the main floor frames of the balcony. The first floor balconies have cast iron valances, brackets, posts and balustrades with timber cap rails. At the ends of each balcony one and a half bays have been enclosed with obscure glass and timber panelling to form sleep-outs and the iron decoration removed. The verandah and balcony to the service courtyard is all of timber with lattice valance to the ground floor. The flooring was renewed in 1985. A t covered way with iron roofs links the kitchen to a detached dairy/meat room at the rear. The floor of the kitchen landing was renewed in 1985.

Fixture and fittings: The main stair is of stained and varnished cedar in two equal flights with mid landing and a storage cupboard underneath. A second access to the first floor is by servant's stair, which is one of two flights with winders. There is an elaborate art nouveau timber screen in the drawing room. There is a large built-in cupboard in room (5) and large floor to ceiling cupboards lining the east and west walls of the linen room (43). There is a large cedar wall cupboard in the washroom (9). There are produce bins and storage shelves lining room (19). There is shelving in the cellar (14) and in rooms 16 and 51. Room 16 also has Formica bench and stainless steel sink. The pantry (12) has a timber bench with sink drainer. There is an electric stove in room 33. Some rooms retain their original gas light brass wall brackets and a few ceiling gas fittings remain.

Fireplaces: The groundfloor chimneypieces are Victorian in style and are generally of varnished cedar. The first floor chimneypieces are painted timber in art nouveau style. Exceptions are a white marble chimneypiece to room 3. There are art nouveau cast iron inserts with tiled sides and hearths in the following rooms. 3,4,5, 6, 22a, 23, 24, and 25. There was a Coleman oil heater in the dining room (11) fireplace, which was removed in 1986. A Vulcan oil heater is in room 8. There are Artesses slow combustion stoves to rooms 26 and 31. There is an artese sitting on the west balcony 28 and another stored in the shed loft (feature 89) The kitchen (15) has an aga slow combustion cooking stove installed in 1936 which is presently oil-fired. The laundry 17 is fitted with a wood-fired copper. There is a wood-fired cast iron stove in kitchen 20.

Hardware: Doors generally have timber door knobs with brass escutcheons and timber fingerplates. Hinges are of iron and all remaining door and window furniture is of brass.

Bathrooms and lavatories: The bathrooms appear to retain their original fittings with the following exceptions: 10 have a new bath, 30 have a new bath and new toilet: 32 have a new toilet. These items date from 1930 to 1950. With the above exceptions all porcelain fittings are white in colour and supplied by Tyllors.

Furnishings: The furnishings date from 1880s to the late 1970s. Several items are of Australian timber and manufactured by Sydney firms such as David Jones & Co. and Beard Watson's. Of considerable interest is a large collection of elaborately carved furniture, picture frames and smaller objects worked by members of the family and friends.

=== Outbuildings and features ===
The main outbuilding complex is situated on the slope to the south of the house. It contains a number of white painted timber structures with iron roofs. These are set amongst grassed paddocks and are interspersed with fences, yards, drains, and troughs. There are copses and a number of individual trees (principally pines and elms).

There are a number of structures, which lie to the west outside the trust's boundary. These include a machine shed, cottage and vehicle shed. Another concentration of outbuildings is situated on the south side of Saumarez Creek, 2 kilometres outside the National Trust's property boundary. This consists of the woolshed and shearer's accommodation.

A gardener's cottage (unoccupied) is located east of the Trust's boundary.

To the south end of the National Trust's property boundary is the site of the early Saumarez Head station of Dumaresq and Thomas. This contained a homestead, stables yards and garden. The structure which have survived from this period are the stables (now Store and a brick addition to the homestead. All the remaining structures in the outbuilding area were built during the White's occupancy. Many were constructed by carpenter/contractor J.McLennan.

A plan of c. 1900–10 depicts the outbuilding area as containing Jack Hay's cottage (northern section) (173), early brick homestead (142), store (132), hay shed (92), blacksmiths machinery shed 989), stables (102) and a structure (possibly a kitchen) (177) between Jack Hay's and the early brick homestead. The office of F.J. White (72) stood on the crest of the ridge and formed the visual and functional link between the main house and the outbuilding area. A path (64) provided access to the office from the house.

=== Condition ===
The physical condition of the property was reported as good as at 16 July 2013. Storm damage occurred to the property in 2001/2, with some trees falling causing damage to some buildings. Several ageing Monterey pines on the entrance drive avenue fell in the storm.

Saumarez is largely intact.

== Heritage listing ==
Saumarez is an extensive pastoral property containing an almost full range of rural building types from humble timber slab vernacular structures to the opulent Victorian House representing the peak in development of this type of property. The main homestead is superbly sited on the crest of a hill with pleasant landscaped grounds and is a good example of a late Victorian Homestead remaining in excellent condition. Saumarez has been in ownership of a branch of the White family for well over a century and remains a fitting reminder of the capabilities of this pioneering dynasty, and its influence in the pastoral industry. Also is part of the famous Saumarez Run occupied by Lieut? Col. Henry Dumaresq in the 1820s.

Saumarez Homestead was listed on the New South Wales State Heritage Register on 1 March 2002 having satisfied the following criteria.

The place is important in demonstrating the course, or pattern, of cultural or natural history in New South Wales.

Saumarez Homestead's historical significance is founded on the work of three families who together have exercised an outstanding influence on the development of new England and particularly Armidale; namely the Dumaresq, Thomas and White families. The collection of working outbuildings and historical archaeological sites which together with the house and contents reflect the creation and subsequent evolution of a successful pastoral property and the lives of the people who lived and worked on it. Saumarez Homestead demonstrates the diverse cultural, social economic and occupational attitudes of rural community from the mid nineteenth to the late twentieth centuries.

The place is important in demonstrating aesthetic characteristics and/or a high degree of creative or technical achievement in New South Wales.

The main homestead is superbly sited on the crest of a hill with pleasant landscaped grounds and is a good example of a late Victorian Homestead remaining in excellent condition.

The place has strong or special association with a particular community or cultural group in New South Wales for social, cultural or spiritual reasons.

The homestead demonstrates simultaneously the lives and contributions of F. J. White and his family who held significant civic and social status in the Armidale community, from the late nineteenth century.

The place has potential to yield information that will contribute to an understanding of the cultural or natural history of New South Wales.

The site has provides information relating to the previous use of the site and the evolution of the site from an early pattern of land occupancy from Aboriginal use through to alienation from the crown and a phase in the settlement and pastoral development of rural New South Wales by large pioneer families.

The place possesses uncommon, rare or endangered aspects of the cultural or natural history of New South Wales.

Saumarez is a substantial country house, in a landscaped setting, together with a collection of furniture, furnishings and memorabilia which have evolved with the family's occupation of the place and which reflects their domestic and personal continuity and development.

== See also ==
- List of historic homesteads in Australia
