= Harold White (politician) =

Australian grazier, soldier and politician

Harold White CMG, DSO

Member of the New South Wales Legislative Council
- In office 8 September 1932 – 22 April 1934

Personal details
- Born: 13 June 1883 Armidale, New South Wales
- Died: 20 February 1971 (aged 87) Armidale, New South Wales
- Party: United Australia Party
- Nickname: "Bill"

Military service
- Allegiance: Australia
- Branch/service: Citizen Military Forces; Australian Imperial Force
- Years of service: 1906–1926
- Rank: Lieutenant Colonel
- Commands: 35th Battalion (1918–19); 33rd Battalion (1918); 36th Battalion (1918)
- Battles/wars: First World War
- Awards: Companion of the Order of St Michael and St George; Distinguished Service Order; Mentioned in Despatches (3); Croix de guerre (France)

Harold Fletcher "Bill" White, CMG, DSO (13 June 1883 – 20 February 1971) was an Australian grazier, soldier and politician.

He was born at Saumarez near Armidale to pastoralist Francis John White and Margaret Fletcher. He was a grazier and partner in the family pastoral company, owning several stations in the New England district, including Saumarez, Bald Blair, Aberfoyle and Ward's Mistake.

In October 1911 he married Evelyn Augusta Bigg Curtis, with whom he had four children. From 1911 to 1929 he served on Guyra Council. An officer in the Citizen Military Forces pre-war, he served with the Australian Imperial Force in the First World War. He reached the rank of lieutenant colonel, commanded the 36th, 33rd and 35th Battalions, was thrice mentioned in despatches, awarded the Distinguished Service Order in 1917 and the French Croix de guerre in 1918, and was appointed a Companion of the Order of St Michael and St George in 1919. From 1930 to 1932 he was on the executive of the Graziers' Association.

He was appointed to the New South Wales Legislative Council in 1932 as a United Australia Party member, but served less than 2 years and did not speak in the house. He didn't seek re-election when the Legislative Council was reconstituted to end life appointments in 1934. He remained active as a Graziers' Association councillor until 1947.

His grandfather Frank White and uncle James Cobb White had also served in the Parliament of New South Wales. He was a cousin of the writer Patrick White.

White died in Armidale in 1971 (aged 87).
