= Frederick Burrows (Australian soldier) =

Australian Army officer

Frederick Alexander Burrows
- Born: 10 November 1897; Wahgunyah, Victoria, Australia
- Died: 23 May 1973 (aged 75); Adelaide, South Australia, Australia
- Military career
- Allegiance: Australia
- Branch: Australian Army
- Service years: 1915–1919; 1921–1945
- Rank: Brigadier
- Nickname: The Bull
- Commands: 1st Infantry Brigade (1942–45); 2/13th Battalion (1940–41); 36th Battalion (1938–40)
- Conflicts: First World War; Gallipoli Campaign; Western Front; Second World War; Operation Crusader; Siege of Tobruk
- Awards: Distinguished Service Order; Military Medal; Cross of Valour (Poland)

Brigadier Frederick Alexander Burrows, DSO, MM (10 November 1897 – 23 May 1973) was a salesman and an Australian Army soldier who served in the First and the Second World Wars. A non-commissioned officer in the First World War, during the Second World War he was commander of the 2/13th Battalion during Operation Crusader and the Siege of Tobruk.

== Early life ==
Frederick Alexander Burrows was born at Wahgunyah in the Australian state of Victoria on 10 November 1897. He was the second child of a labourer, also named Frederick, and his wife, Hester née Nugent. He went to schools in New South Wales and was working as a grocer's assistant at the time of his enlistment in the Australian Imperial Force (AIF) in April 1915. He falsified his age in order to join the AIF.

== First World War ==
Embarking for Egypt in July 1915, Burrows was posted to the 7th Battalion, at the time serving on the Gallipoli peninsula. The battalion remained there until the evacuation in December, after which it was withdrawn back to Egypt for reorganisation. In March 1916, it was transferred to the Western Front in France. By this time, Burrows had been promoted to lance corporal. Burrows fought in the Battle of Pozières of July 1916, during which he was wounded. He was promoted to sergeant a few months later. The 7th Battalion was transferred to the Ypres sector, and then the Somme, rotating between the two for the next two years. In August 1918, during the German spring offensive, Burrows was awarded the Military Medal for his leadership of a bombing party assaulting German-held trenches. He was wounded for a second time later that month which saw him evacuated to England for medical treatment. On recovering from his wounds, he was commissioned as an officer. He returned to Australia several months after the end of the war, and was discharged from the AIF.

== Interwar period ==
Returning to civilian life, Burrows found employment at an engineering company in Melbourne. He retained an interest in military service, and joined the militia, known as Citizens Military Force. He served initially in the 14th Battalion but in 1934, following a transfer to his employer's offices in Sydney where he took up a position as sales manager, he was posted to the 36th Battalion. Four years later, he was promoted to lieutenant colonel and appointed commander of the battalion.

== Second World War ==
In March 1940, Burrows was appointed commander of the Eastern Command Recruit Training Depot and then the following month enlisted in the Second Australian Imperial Force for service aboard. He was made commander of the 2/13th Battalion. His new command numbered about 900 personnel and was part of the 20th Brigade, 7th Division. He soon earned the nickname the Bull, on account of his robust voice. Burrows and his battalion arrived in the Middle East in November 1940.

In February 1941, the 20th Brigade, including Burrow's battalion, was transferred to the newly formed 9th Division. The following month, the battalion was in Cyrenaica. In the run-up to and during the Siege of Tobruk, Burrows led his battalion well. During this time, he had to achieve a fighting withdrawal of his battalion at Er Regima, near Benghazi, in the face of advancing German armour and was an aggressive commander at Tobruk, striving to extend the defensive lines. In the latter stages of the defence, his battalion came under the command of the Polish Brigade and was responsible for the western perimeter. When offensive operations in conjunction with Operation Crusader began in November 1941, the 2/13th Battalion provided part of the reserve, the only Australian unit to be involved. During these operations, he arranged and conducted a night attack at Ed Duda on 30 November, successfully recapturing the position that had been lost earlier in the day. The next day he was seriously wounded by artillery.

Because of his wounds, Burrows returned to Australia. He was mentioned in despatches and awarded the Distinguished Service Order for his services in North Africa. He was also awarded a Polish award, the Cross of Valour. In May 1942, he was promoted to brigadier. He commanded the 1st Infantry Brigade, a CMF formation stationed in New South Wales, for the rest of the war. He was placed on the retired list in July 1945, his wounds preventing him from returning to active duty.

== Later life ==
On being discharged, Burrows returned to his pre-war role with Cooper Engineering. In 1946, he set up the Adelaide office for the firm. He also served on the Repatriation Board for South Australia for a time. In 1959, he went into retirement. His wife, Isabel née Mathieson, who he had married in 1921, died in 1963. The following year he married again, to Thelma, a widow. He died at Adelaide's Repatriation General Hospital on 23 May 1973. He was survived by his second wife and two children from his first marriage.
