= George Cartwright (soldier) =

Australian recipient of the Victoria Cross

George Cartwright VC ED
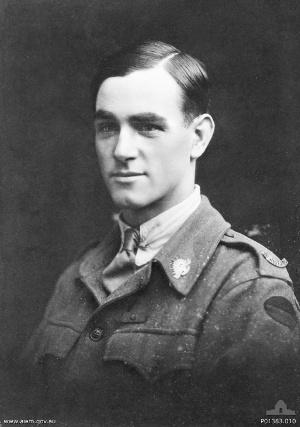
- George Cartwright c.1919
- Born: 9 December 1894; South Kensington, London, England
- Died: 2 February 1978 (aged 83); Gordon, New South Wales, Australia
- Military career
- Allegiance: Australia
- Branch: Australian Army
- Service years: 1915–46
- Rank: Captain
- Conflicts: First World War; Western Front; Battle of Messines; Hundred Days Offensive; Battle of Mont St. Quentin; Battle of St. Quentin Canal; Second World War
- Awards: Victoria Cross; Efficiency Decoration

George Cartwright, VC, ED (9 December 1894 – 2 February 1978) was a British-born Australian recipient of the Victoria Cross, the highest award for gallantry in the face of the enemy that can be awarded to British and Commonwealth forces. He was one of 64 Australians to receive the award for their actions during the First World War, performing the deeds that led to his award in September 1918 during the Battle of Mont Saint-Quentin while serving with Australian Imperial Force on the Western Front. After the war, Cartwright returned to Australia and worked as a mechanic. He continued to serve in the military part-time, returning to full-time service during the Second World War, undertaking a training role in Australia. He was demobilised in 1946, and returned to civilian life. He died at the age of 83.

== Early life ==
Cartwright was born in South Kensington, London, on 9 December 1894 to William Edward Cartwright, a coach trimmer, and his wife Elizabeth (née Stracey). He attended the local school, before emigrating to Australia in 1912 at the age of eighteen without his family. Settling in New South Wales, Cartwright gained employment at a sheep station in the Elsmore district as a labourer.

== First World War ==
On 9 December 1915—his 21st birthday—Cartwright enlisted in the Australian Imperial Force for service during the First World War. Allotted to the newly raised 33rd Battalion—an infantry battalion raised in New South Wales—as a private, he embarked aboard HMAT Marathon at Sydney on 4 May 1916. Disembarking at Devonport, England, two months later, the members of the 33rd Battalion spent the following four months training at Larkhill Camp on Salisbury Plain.

After the 3rd Division, to which the 33rd Battalion was assigned, deployed to the Western Front in November 1916, Cartwright served with them through the Battle of Messines where he was wounded in June 1917. Later, in April 1918, he was wounded again when the 33rd Battalion's position was attacked with gas while holding a position around Villers-Bretonneux. He was briefly hospitalised but returned to duty in June. In August, the Allies launched the Hundred Days Offensive around Amiens, which resulted in a series of advances as the Allies sought to break through the Hindenburg Line.

On 31 August 1918, at Road Wood, south-west of Bouchavesnes, near Peronne, France, when two companies became held up by machine gun fire, Cartwright attacked the gun alone under intense fire. He shot three of the crew, and, having bombed the post, captured the gun and nine enemy soldiers. For his actions he was recommended for the Victoria Cross. On 30 September 1918 he was wounded and evacuated to England. Cartwright was conferred with his VC by King George V, and at the end of the war Cartwright was repatriated to Australia, arriving in March 1919 and as the AIF was demobilised, he was discharged on 16 May 1919. For his war service he received the following medals: the Victoria Cross, the British War Medal and the Victory Medal.

== Inter-war years and Second World War ==
During the inter-war years, Cartwright moved to Sydney, where he found work as a motor mechanic. He married Elsie Broker at St Stephen's Anglican Church, at Chatswood, New South Wales, on 25 June 1921. They later had two children, but the marriage ended in divorce. He remained in the military, serving part-time in the Militia, posted to the 4th/3rd Battalion, eventually being commissioned as an officer on 25 February 1932. Following the outbreak of the Second World War, Cartwright was mobilised for war service on 5 March 1940, serving in a training role in Australia. He was promoted to captain in 1942, and served throughout the war. In addition to the decorations he received for his previous service, Cartwright also later received the Efficiency Decoration and the War Medal 1939–1945.

== Later life ==
After the war, Cartwright was demobilised in May 1946. He later worked as an assistant-cashier and in 1948 remarried, exchanging nuptials with Evelyn Mary Short on 4 September 1948 in the Congregational Church, at Pitt Street in Sydney. During his later life, he attended several functions held in London for Victoria Cross and George Cross recipients. He died at the age of 84 on 2 February 1978, at Gordon, New South Wales; his wife and one of his children survived him. He was cremated and his Victoria Cross and other decorations were later donated by his widow to the Imperial War Museum in London, where they are currently held.

Cartwright is commemorated in the New South Wales Garden of Remembrance, at Rookwood, and also at the Kurrajong Memorial in Inverell, New South Wales, which was unveiled in 2005 in honour of the 114 men from the town who enlisted in January 1916.

== Bibliography ==
- Bomford, Michelle (2012). The Battle of Mont St Quentin–Peronne 1918. Australian Army Campaigns Series # 11. Newport, New South Wales: Big Sky Publishing. ISBN 978-1-921941962.
- Gliddon, Gerald (2000). The Road to Victory 1918. VCs of the First World War. Sparkford, England: Sutton Publishing Limited. ISBN 0-7509-2083-1.
- "George Cartwright – Discovering Anzacs". National Archives of Australia.
- George Cartwright on Lives of the First World War
