= 32nd Brigade (Australia) =

Infantry brigade of the Australian Army during World War II

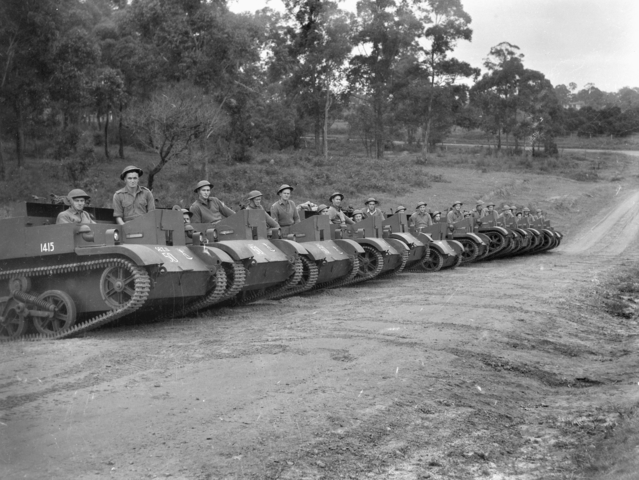
- The 13th/33rd Battalion's carrier platoon at Sydney in 1943. The 13th/33rd was formed from elements that had previously existed as part of the 32nd Brigade
- Active: January – September 1942
- Country: Australia
- Allegiance: Australian Crown
- Branch: Australian Army
- Type: Infantry
- Size: Brigade

The 32nd Brigade was a formation of the Australian Army during World War II. A militia formation, the brigade was formed at Broadmeadow, New South Wales, in January 1942, as part of the Newcastle Covering Force and then the 10th Division. After carrying out defensive duties on the coast south of Newcastle at the height of invasion fears, as the threat subsided the brigade was disbanded in September 1942 and its constituent units reallocated to other formations or disbanded.

== History ==
The 32nd Brigade was established as an emergency measure during a period when there were fears of a Japanese invasion of Australia, which resulted in a mobilisation of Australia's part-time military forces to defend key areas around the mainland. Established as part of the Newcastle Covering Force, after opening its headquarters, the brigade moved to Warners Bay, and assumed control of several units that had previously been undertaking defensive duties around the beaches south of Newcastle. These included the 33rd Battalion, which was transferred from the 1st Brigade and covered the area from Dudley to Belmont, as well as the 8th Garrison Battalion (covering Shepherds Hill to Dudley), and a squadron from the 16th Machine Gun Regiment, which was tasked with patrolling around Wyong. The 4th Battalion joined the brigade in March–April, assuming the defences around Gateshead, allowing the 33rd to move to Toronto. The Newcastle Covering Force was converted on 15 April 1942 to the 10th Division, following a complete re-organisation of the higher command structures of the Australian Army.

The following month, the 8th Garrison Battalion assumed all forward defensive positions, while the remainder of the brigade carried out training. The 4th Battalion returned to the 8th Brigade, based around Greta, in June, and after this the 33rd Battalion returned to its defensive duties. The 8th Garrison Battalion occupying the forward positions with a single company, while the remainder of the brigade deployed in depth, and continued its training with a view to assuming a more mobile defensive posture. As the war situation clarified itself, it became clear to Army planners that some headquarters elements were no longer required. As a result, both the 10th Division and the 32nd Brigade headquarters were disbanded in September. The 33rd Battalion subsequently merged with the 13th, and was assigned to the 1st Brigade again. Meanwhile, the 8th Garrison Battalion became part of the New South Wales line of communications area, but was disbanded in November 1942.

The brigade's only commander was Lieutenant Colonel Kenneth Flavelle.

== Units ==
The 32nd Brigade consisted of the following units:

- 8th Garrison Battalion
- 33rd Battalion
- 4th Battalion (15 April – 1 June 1942)

== See also ==
- List of Australian Army brigades
