= 9th Brigade (Australia) =

Formation of the Australian Army

- Active: 1912–present
- Country: Australia
- Branch: Army
- Size: 1,100 (regular); 1,700 (reserve)
- Part of: Forces Command
- Garrison/HQ: Keswick, South Australia
- Motto: Non nobis sed patriae (Not for self but for country)
- Engagements: World War I: Western Front

Commanders
- Notable commanders: Charles Rosenthal

Insignia
- Unit colour patch

The 9th Brigade is a Reserve formation of the Australian Army headquartered at Keswick Barracks in Keswick, South Australia, with elements located in New South Wales and South Australia. The brigade was first raised in 1912 in New South Wales following the introduction of the compulsory training scheme.

During World War I, the brigade was formed as part of the First Australian Imperial Force in 1916, with four battalions formed in New South Wales, including three from the Hunter Valley. It was assigned to the 3rd Division, and training was carried out in the United Kingdom before the brigade was committed to the fighting on the Western Front in November 1916. It fought in numerous battles in France and Belgium for the next two years.

After the war, the brigade was disbanded, but was re-raised as a part-time formation in the Sydney area. During World War II, the brigade was mobilised for defensive duties, but did not see active service before it was disbanded in June 1944. In the post war period, the 9th Brigade was re-raised once again as a part-time formation, and forms part of the 2nd Division.

== History ==
The 9th Brigade traces its origins to 1912, when it was formed as a Militia brigade as part of the introduction of the compulsory training scheme, assigned to the 2nd Military District. The brigade's constituent units were spread across various locations in New South Wales including Camperdown, Darlington, Enmore, Newtown, Marrickville, St Peters and Petersham.

During World War I, the 9th Brigade was originally formed as part of the First Australian Imperial Force. Raised from volunteers drawn from New South Wales, the 9th Brigade was formed in 1916 in the period as the AIF was expanded following the failed Gallipoli Campaign. The brigade consisted of four infantry battalions—the 33rd (formed at Armidale, NSW), 34th (Maitland, NSW), 35th (Newcastle, NSW) and 36th Battalions (also Newcastle), as well as the 9th Light Trench Mortar Battery and the 9th Machine Gun Company (which later formed part of the 3rd Machine Gun Battalion). Its first commander was Brigadier General Alexander Jobson.

The brigade was attached to the 3rd Division. After rudimentary training in Australia, the brigade was shipped to England to complete its training before being committed to the fighting on the Western Front in France and Belgium in November 1916. The brigade's first major battle came in mid-1917 when it took part in the Battle of Messines. Later in 1917, it fought during the Battle of Passchendaele before taking part in defensive operations during the German spring offensive in early 1918.

In April 1918 it was involved in the Allied counterattack at the First Battle of Villers-Bretonneux. This was followed by the Second Battle of Morlancourt. The brigade took part in the final offensive of the war, the Hundred Days Offensive. During this time, the 9th Brigade's casualties had been so high, that one of its battalions—the 36th—had to be disbanded in order to reinforce the others. After Jobson, the brigade's other wartime commanders were Charles Rosenthal and Henry Goddard.

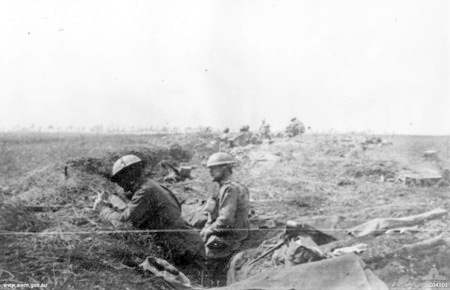
The 35th Battalion's position near Lena Wood, 8 August 1918

Following the end of hostilities the brigade was disbanded in 1919. However, while the AIF had been deployed, a separate Citizens Force (later known as the Militia) formation remained in Australia. By 1918, a 9th Brigade had been established within the 2nd Military District, consisting of the 33rd, 34th, 35th and 36th Infantry Battalions.

The AIF was formally disbanded in 1921, at which time it was decided to reorganise the Citizens Force to perpetuate the numerical designations of the AIF. Headquartered in Paddington, in Sydney, the brigade was subsequently reorganised after which it consisted of four infantry battalions—the 1st, 19th, 34th and 45th Battalions. It remained part of the 2nd Military District and by 1928 it formed part of the 2nd Infantry Division.

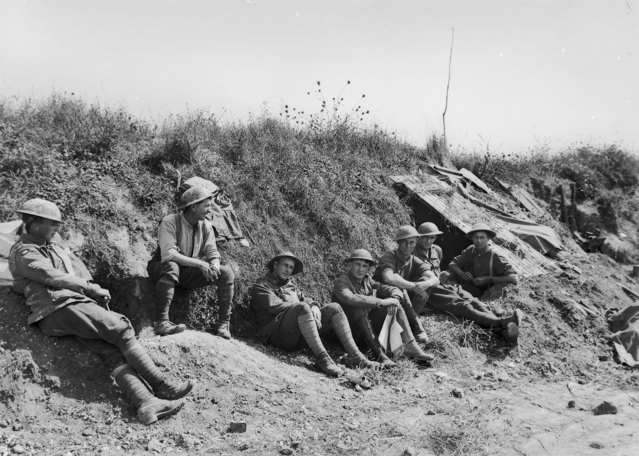
Troops from the 34th Battalion—part of the 9th Brigade—at Picardie, 21 August 1918

At the outset of World War II, the brigade was tasked with the defence of Sydney, and consisted of the 1st, 4th, 17th and 45th Battalions. In April 1941, the brigade was transferred to the 1st Division and later reduced to three infantry battalions: the 1st, 17th and 18th. Following Japan's entry into the war, the brigade was called up for full time service and mobilised at Narellan before moving to Thornleigh, where it covered an area between Manly to Dee Why and Mona Vale. During this time, the brigade's focus was upon construction of defences. Elements of the 8th Brigade relieved them in March 1942, allowing the brigade to commencing training at Wallgrove to adopt a more mobile defensive posture.

In late 1942, the brigade was warned out to deploy to Darwin, Northern Territory, but was instead moved to the Illawarra region. Throughout 1943, the numbers of troops retained in New South Wales was reduced as the garrison was moved north, and elements of the Militia were disbanded to return personnel to war essential war industries. Finally, in June 1944, the 9th Brigade, consisting of the 1st/45th, 17th and 20th/34th Battalions, was disbanded at Narellan.

Following the end of the war, the Citizens Military Force was not re-established until 1948, when it was re-raised on a reduced establishment. Post war the brigade was part of the 3rd Division, and consisted of the 10th and 27th Battalions. By 1953, the 9th Brigade had been formed within Central Command.

Since then the brigade has been a Reserve formation, although at times its designation has been changed. From the mid-1960s to the mid-1970s it adopted the title of the 9th Task Force. The current 9th Brigade was raised on 1 February 1988 in Land Command. Around this time, the brigade was tasked with vital asset protection in northern Australia, in the event of war. On 1 September 1994, the brigade moved from under command of Land Headquarters to form part of the 2nd Division, based in South Australia. By 2000, the brigade's area of responsibility included both the Northern Territory and South Australia.

=== 21st century ===
In November 2008, the 9th Brigade mounted Rotation 17 to the Solomon Islands under the command of Lieutenant Colonel Russ Lowes, in support of Regional Assistance Mission to Solomon Islands (RAMSI). Rotation 17 completed their deployment and returned to Adelaide on 5 April 2009. Personnel from the 9th Brigade have also recently taken part in operational deployments to Afghanistan and Timor, and border security operations in the waters to Australia's north. Under Plan Beersheba, the brigade is tasked with generating a battlegroup in support of the 1st Brigade, one year in every three.

In late October 2022, the 1st Armoured Regiment and the 7th Battalion, the Royal Australian Regiment were transferred to the 9th Brigade. This Brigade was also transferred from the 2nd Division to Forces Command.

== Organisation ==
As of 2024, 9th Brigade is located across South Australia, and consists of the following units:

- HQ 9th Brigade (headquartered at Keswick, South Australia);
- 1st Armoured Regiment (armoured cavalry regiment) (Horseshoe Lines, Edinburgh Defence Precinct, South Australia)
  - A Squadron — 3rd/9th Light Horse (South Australian Mounted Rifles) (Reserve)
- 10th/27th Battalion, Royal South Australia Regiment (South Australia)
- 3rd Field Squadron (South Australia)
- 144th Signals Squadron (South Australia)
- 9th Combat Service Support Battalion (South Australia)
