= 33rd Battalion (Australia) =

- Active: 1916–1919; 1921–1929; 1936–1942
- Country: Australia
- Branch: Australian Army
- Type: Infantry
- Size: ~900 – 1,000 men
- Part of: 9th Brigade, 3rd Division
- Colours: Black and green
- Engagements: World War I: Western Front

Insignia
- Unit colour patch

The 33rd Battalion was an infantry battalion of the Australian Army. Formed in 1916, the battalion fought on the Western Front during World War I. It was disbanded after the war, but later re-raised as a part-time unit based in New South Wales. During the inter war years, it was amalgamated with other battalions a couple of times before being re-raised in its own right in 1936. During World War II, the battalion remained in Australia and in 1942 was amalgamated with the 13th Battalion, which was disbanded the following year having not served overseas.

== History ==
=== World War I ===
Raised for service during World War I as part of the all-volunteer 1st Australian Imperial Force (AIF), the 33rd Battalion was formed in Australian in January 1916 as part of an expansion of the AIF that took place after the Gallipoli campaign. The majority of the battalion's personnel came from the New England region of New South Wales and as a result the 33rd Battalion came to be known unofficially as "New England's Own". and then the "Northern Battalion". Along with the 34th, 35th and 36th Battalions, all of which were raised from New South Wales, the 33rd formed the 9th Brigade of the Australian 3rd Division. Consisting of four companies, initially the battalion was formed along regional lines: 'A' Company was made from recruits drawn from Armidale and Tamworth; 'B' Company from Walcha, Uralla, Barraba, Bingara, New South Wales, and Manilla; 'C' Company from Narrabri, Moree, and Inverell; and 'D' Company from Glen Innes, Guyra, and Tenterfield. With an authorised strength of 1,023 men, the battalion's first commanding officer was Major Clifford Russell Richardson, "The Daily Telegraph", 10th Feb 1916, then Major Benjamin Frederick Parker, The Bathurst Times, 4 March 1916, who fell ill soon after being given command. Major Leslie Morshead who was the 2IC at that stage, was then given the command of the 33rd Battalion, and was the sole commanding officer while the battalion was overseas on active-service. He later reached the rank of lieutenant general and commanded an Australian corps against the Japanese during World War II. After undertaking initial training at the showgrounds in Armidale, the battalion moved to Maitland, where they concentrated with the rest of the 9th Brigade. On 3 May 1916 the battalion entrained for Sydney, where they embarked upon HMAT Marathon. Although originally it had been intended that they would go to Egypt, en route the battalion was redirected to the United Kingdom.

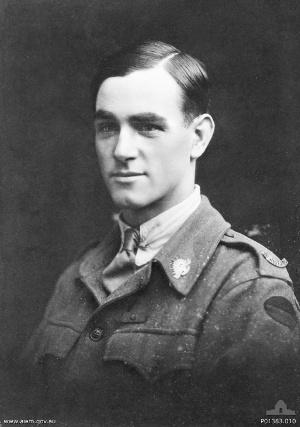
George Cartwright, one of two men from the 33rd to receive the Victoria Cross.

Sailing via Albany, in Western Australia, and making stops at Durban, Cape Town and Dakar, the battalion arrived in the United Kingdom on 9 July 1916. Moving to Larkhill, on Salisbury Plain, the 33rd underwent five months of intense training along with the rest of the 3rd Division to prepare them for the rigours of war on the Western Front, before moving to France in late November, crossing the English Channel on the ferry Mona Queen. After arriving in Le Havre, in France, the battalion moved by rail to Bailleul, from where they marched to the front, occupying a section of the line around Armentières. Assigned to a "nursery" sector, for the next month they rotated between occupying the forward trenches and undertaking training courses, as the battalion was introduced to life on the European battlefield. Although the battalion gained some experience of combat over Christmas, when they launched raids against the German lines, their first major battle did not come until mid-1917, by which time the focus of British operations had shifted to the Ypres sector in Belgium.

This first battle came at Messines where the 33rd, along with the rest of the 9th Brigade, led the 3rd Division's assault. After a number of mines were exploded in front of their positions, the assault began. The 33rd went in on the right, around Ploegsteert Wood, having been chosen especially for the position due to its danger. Despite suffering around 200 casualties from Allied gas-shells that had dropped short, the battalion went "over the top" at the appointed hour and, after skirting the large crater the mine had caused, secured their objective. After the battle, the battalion remained at the front, holding the ground they had gained, enduring almost constant shelling. The 33rd's casualties amounted to 92 killed in action or died of wounds, and 260 wounded; the heaviest they would suffer for the entire war. Messines was followed by actions during the Third Battle of Ypres in October. Moving up to Zonnebeke on the night of 2/3 October, in the first week of the push against Broodseinde, they were assigned a support role as the narrowness of the front limited the role of the 3rd Division. On 12 October the Allied attack progressed into a second phase and the 3rd Division was thrown into the assault during the First Battle of Passchendaele. Heavily depleted, with a frontage of just 242 men, they fought around Augustus Wood, where the Germans had established many pillboxes before heavy rain washed away any hope of an Allied breakthrough.

The following year, as the Germans launched a major offensive on the Western Front, they were thrust into the line in a desperate attempt to hold the line in front of the vital railhead of Amiens. There, the 33rd took part in heavy fighting when the Australians counter-attacked at Hangard Wood on 30 March, before finally turning back the German attack on Villers-Bretonneux on 4 April. At the end of the month, the battalion amalgamated with the 36th Battalion, as part of a general re-organisation of the AIF necessitated by heavy casualties and falling recruitment, which saw the disbandment of three battalions – the 36th, 47th and 52nd – in order to reinforce others. A peaceful penetration action was fought around Morlancourt by the 9th Brigade in early May 1918. In August, the Allies launched their own offensive – the Hundred Days Offensive – which ultimately brought about an end to the war. The 33rd was committed to the battle on 8 August, tasked with capturing Accroche Wood. A series of advances followed as the Allies broke through the German defences along the Hindenburg Line. After attacking around Road Wood in late August, they were withdrawn for three weeks training before taking part in a joint American-Australian attack at Bellecourt in late September. Following up the Americans, the 33rd held off a strong counter-attack by German forces around Gillemont Farm, before carrying out mopping-up operations towards Bony. After this, in early October, the battalion was pulled back to the Abbeville area, taking up billets in Citerne, where they remained until the armistice was signed in November.

Following the end of hostilities, the battalion's numbers were slowly reduced as personnel were repatriated to Australia for demobilisation and finally, in May 1919, the battalion was disbanded. During the course of the war, the 33rd Battalion lost 451 killed men and 2,052 wounded. Two members of the battalion received the Victoria Cross: John Carroll and George Cartwright. The battalion received a total of 14 battle honours, which were bestowed upon it in 1927.

=== Inter war years and subsequent service ===
After the war, when Australia's military was re-organised to perpetuate the numerical designations of the AIF units in 1921, the battalion was reformed as a part-time unit of the Citizens Force, based in the New England region, assigned to the 1st Brigade. This was achieved by transferring personnel from two previously existing units: the 2nd Battalion, 33rd Infantry Regiment and the 2nd Battalion, 35th Infantry Regiment. In 1927, when territorial designations were introduced, the battalion adopted the title of the "New England Regiment" and the Latin motto Strenue Percute (translated strike vigorously), which had previously been used by the battalion during the war, was confirmed. From the outset, the Citizen Forces units were maintained through a mixture of voluntary and compulsory service; however, in 1929, the Universal Training Scheme was abolished by the Scullin Labor government and replaced with an all volunteer force known as the "Militia". This, coupled with the austerity of the Great Depression, resulted in a decline of volunteers and, as a result, the 33rd Battalion was amalgamated with the 35th Battalion to form the 35th/33rd Battalion. In 1933, the 35th/33rd was split and the 33rd joined with the 41st Battalion to form the 33rd/41st Battalion. They remained linked until October 1936, when the 33rd Battalion was reformed in its own right as part of an expansion of Australia's military force as tensions rose in Europe, raising concerns of a future war.

During World War II, due to the provisions of the Defence Act, which precluded Militia units from being sent outside Australian territory to fight, the battalion remained in Australia undertaking garrison duties. Initially it served as part of the 1st Brigade, but in February 1942, following Japan's entry into the war, the 33rd Battalion was transferred to the 32nd Brigade, which formed part of the Newcastle Covering Force that had been tasked to defend against a possible Japanese invasion. On 27 August 1942, the battalion was linked with the 13th Battalion to become the 13th/33rd Battalion. It was disbanded on 25 November 1943 having not served outside Australia; the 33rd has remained off the Australian Army's order of battle since then. The battalion did not receive any battle honours for direct involvement in the war, but in 1961, the battalion was entrusted with the 20 battle honours earned by the 2/33rd Battalion, which was a Second Australian Imperial Force unit that fought in North Africa, Syria and the South West Pacific Area during World War II.

== Alliances ==
The 33rd Battalion held the following alliances:

- United Kingdom – The Duke of Wellington's Regiment (West Riding).

== Battle honours ==
For its service, the 33rd Battalion received the following battle honours:

- World War I: Messines 1917, Ypres 1917, Polygon Wood, Broodseinde, Poelcappelle, Passchendaele, Somme 1918, Ancre 1918, Amiens, Albert 1918, Mont St Quentin, Hindenburg Line, St Quentin Canal, France and Flanders 1916–18.
- World War II: North Africa 1941, Syria 1941, Syrian Frontier, Mejayun, South West Pac 1942–45, Kokoda Trail, Ioribaiwa, Eora Creek–Templeton's Crossing II, Oivi–Gorari, Buna–Gona, Gona, Lae–Nadzab, Lae Road, Liberation of Australian New Guinea, Ramu Valley, Shaggy Ridge, Borneo, Balikpapan, Milford Highway (inherited).

== Commanding officers ==
The following officers commanded the 33rd during World War I:

- Lieutenant Colonel Clifford Russell Richardson;
- Lieutenant Colonel Benjamin Frederick Parker;
- Lieutenant Colonel Leslie James Morshead;
- Lieutenant Colonel Harold Fletcher White.

The following officers commanded the 33rd during World War II:

- Lieutenant Colonel Ivan Dougherty;
- Lieutenant Colonel Charles Assheton
- Lieutenant Colonel Albert Hague

== See also ==
- List of Australian Victoria Cross recipients
- Lt Thomas Armstrong Memorial, a heritage-listed memorial to a member of the 33rd Battalion
