= 35th Battalion (Australia) =

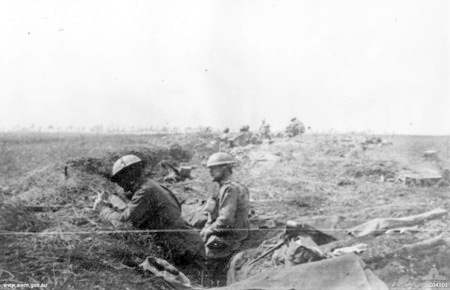
- The 35th Battalion's position near Lena Wood, 8 August 1918
- Active: 1915–1919; 1921–1929; 1939–1946
- Country: Australia
- Branch: Australian Army
- Type: Infantry
- Size: ~800–1,000 men (Note: During the First World War the authorised strength of Australian infantry battalions was 1,023. During the Second World War it dropped to 803 men.)
- Nickname: "Newcastle's Own Regiment"
- Motto: Fidelis Et Paratus
- Colours: Brown over green
- Engagements: First World War: Western Front; Second World War: Huon Peninsula campaign

Insignia
- Unit colour patch

The 35th Battalion was an infantry battalion of the Australian Army. Originally raised in late 1915 for service during the First World War, the battalion saw service on the Western Front in France and Belgium before being disbanded in 1919. In 1921, it was re-raised in the Newcastle region of New South Wales as a unit of the Citizens Force (later known as the "Militia"). It was subsequently amalgamated a number of times during the inter-war years following the Great Depression, firstly with the 33rd Battalion and then the 2nd Battalion, before being re-raised in its own right upon the outbreak of the Second World War. Following this the battalion undertook garrison duties in Australia before being deployed to New Guinea where they took part in the Huon Peninsula campaign. After the end of the war, the 35th Battalion was disbanded in early 1946.

== History ==
=== First World War ===
The 35th Battalion was originally raised during the First World War in December 1915 as part of efforts to expand the size of the Australian Imperial Force from two infantry divisions to five following the Gallipoli campaign. Raised in Newcastle, New South Wales, from volunteers drawn mainly from the local area, the battalion adopted the unofficial title of "Newcastle's Own". Upon formation, the battalion was assigned to the 9th Brigade, 3rd Division, and following an initial period of training it proceeded overseas. Sailing from Sydney on 1 May 1916, they arrived in the United Kingdom in early July and undertook further training before being transferred to France in November 1916 along with the rest of the 3rd Division. On 26 November 1916, they took up positions in the trenches along the Western Front for the first time.

A harsh winter followed in which the battalion was engaged in a relatively quiet sector. Subsequently, it was not until June 1917 that they were involved in a major battle. On 7 June 1917, the 35th Battalion took part in the fighting around Messines. During the First Battle of Passchendaele the battalion was committed to the attack on 12 October 1917 and suffered heavy casualties as the attack foundered in the mud of the rain soaked battlefield. Of the 508 men that had been fit at the start, only 90 remained at the end. As a result of these losses, the battalion was withdrawn from the front line and placed in reserve for the next five months as they were brought back up to strength.

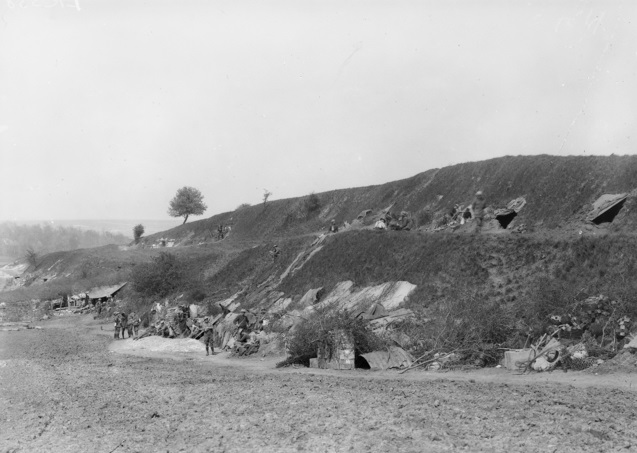
Headquarters troops of the 35th Battalion near Morlancourt, 9 May 1918

The German spring offensive in early 1918 saw them gain a considerable amount of ground as the Allies were forced back. During this time, the 35th Battalion was dispatched to defend the town of Amiens, taking up positions around Villers-Bretonneux. As the German onslaught began to run out of steam, the Australians launched a counter-attack at Hangard Wood on 30 March 1918. On 4 April, the Germans made another attempt at taking Villers-Bretonneux, and the 35th Battalion was heavily engaged in turning this back. Casualties during this time were heavy, consisting of an estimated 70 per cent of the battalion's strength. In early May, the battalion took part in the Second Battle of Morlancourt. On 8 August 1918, the Allies launched their own offensive, the Hundred Days Offensive, and the 35th was again committed to the fighting around Amiens. Following this they were involved in several engagements as Allied forces advanced towards the defences of the Hindenburg Line. Their final involvement in the war came in September when the battalion was called upon to provide reinforcements for the joint Australian–American operations to breach the German line.

Following this, the battalions of the Australian Corps were removed from the line for rest. They had been severely depleted and were suffering from acute manpower shortages as a result of the combination of a decrease in the number of volunteers from Australia and the decision to grant home leave to men who had served for over four years. Subsequently, when the armistice was signed on 11 November 1918, the Australian Corps had not returned to the front and was still in the rear reorganising and training. With the end of hostilities the demobilisation process began, and men were slowly repatriated back to Australia. Finally, in March 1919, the 35th Battalion was disbanded. During the war, the battalion lost 581 men killed or died on active service, while a further 1,637 were wounded. Members of the battalion received the following decorations: one Companion of the Order of St Michael and St George, three Distinguished Service Orders, 17 Military Crosses and three Bars, 10 Distinguished Conduct Medals, 72 Military Medals and one Bar, six Meritorious Service Medals, 28 Mentions in Despatches and four foreign awards. The 35th Battalion was awarded 14 battle honours for its service during the war in 1927.

=== Inter-war years ===
In 1921, the decision was made to reorganise the Australian Army to perpetuate the numerical designations and battle honours of the AIF units that had fought during the First World War. This was done by redesignating the units of the Citizens Force that existed at the time and merging them with their associated AIF units. As a result, the 35th Battalion was reformed at this time, being re-raised in the Newcastle area in order to maintain the regional identity of the predecessor units; upon being re-formed, the battalion drew personnel from 1st and 2nd Infantry Regiments. In 1927, the units of the Citizens Force adopted territorial designations and the 35th Battalion officially became "Newcastle's Own Regiment"; the battalion also adopted the motto Fidelis Et Paratus at this time. In 1929, due to the economic downturn of the Great Depression coupled with the manpower shortage that resulted from the discontinuation of the compulsory training scheme, the decision was made to amalgamate a number of infantry battalions at this time. (Note: At this time it was also decided to change the name of the force, with the title of "Militia" being adopted as it was felt that it implied voluntary service rather than forced.) The 35th Battalion was one of those chosen, and subsequently it was linked with the 33rd Battalion, to form the 35th/33rd Infantry Battalion. In 1932, this battalion was split up and the 35th was subsequently merged with the 2nd Battalion to form the 2nd/35th Battalion, although they were subsequently separated on 4 September 1939 and reformed in their own right. During the inter-war years, alliances were approved with the British Northumberland Fusiliers and the Canadian The Queen's York Rangers (1st American Regiment).

=== Second World War ===
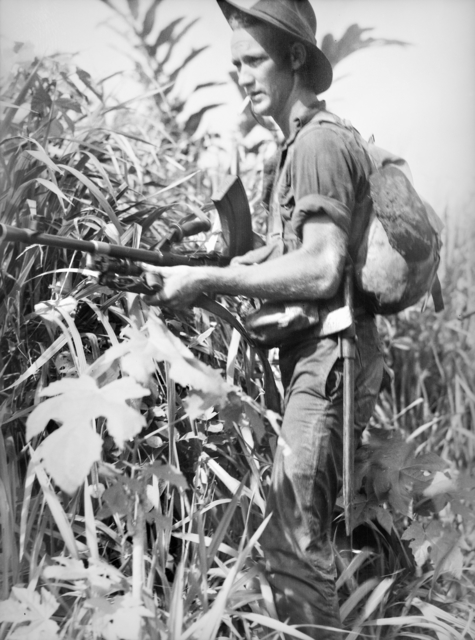
A soldier from the 35th Battalion on patrol around Alexishafen, May 1944

Because of the provisions of the Defence Act (1903) which precluded deploying the Militia outside of Australian territory, following the outbreak of the Second World War the decision was made by the government to raise an all volunteer force for overseas service, known as the Second Australian Imperial Force (2nd AIF). At this time the role of the units of the Militia was conceived as providing experienced personnel to provide cadre staff for the 2nd AIF, as well as managing the training of conscripts that were called up as part of the compulsory training scheme which was re-established in early 1940. During this time the Militia were called up in cohorts for periods of continuous training, however, it was not until early 1942, as the strategic situation in the Pacific deteriorated, that the 35th Battalion was required for full-time service. At this time they were used to man defensive positions around St Ives, in Sydney.

In June 1942, the 35th Battalion was assigned to the 8th Brigade, and moved to Greta Camp where they joined the other battalions of the brigade, the 4th and 30th Battalions. Further training was scheduled, however, the following month the 8th Brigade was moved to Western Australia where they were employed on garrison duties along the coast, occupying defensive positions between Bunbury to Geraldton. They remained there until late 1943 when they were moved across the country to Gordonvale, Queensland, to begin training for a possible deployment overseas.

The 8th Brigade was subsequently transferred from the 2nd Division to the 5th Division and in January 1944, the 35th Battalion was deployed to New Guinea. After this they were used to support the units of the 9th Division which were taking part in the Huon Peninsula campaign. The 8th Brigade was assigned the task of clearing the coast between Sio and Saidor, and the 35th undertook numerous patrols along the mountain tracks and around the villages in the hinterland while the 4th and 30th Battalions advanced along the coast. As the focus of the Australian advance turned to Madang, the 35th moved inland to the south of the Rempi River. As the brigade sought to keep the Japanese forces around Alexishafen off balance, the battalion moved to Megiar Harbour and began to move along the coast, reaching Kronprinz Harbour and then Suara Bay by the start of June 1944. The battalion was subsequently relieved by the 4th Battalion, which continued the advance.

Following this the battalion remained with the 8th Brigade in New Guinea undertaking garrison duties, based around the Madang–Hansa Bay area. In August 1945, the Japanese announced their surrender and the fighting came to end. At this time, the 35th Battalion was sent to Wewak where they began the demobilisation process. During this time a large number of the battalion's personnel were either repatriated to Australia or transferred to other units for subsequent service. Finally, on 24 January 1946, the remaining personnel embarked upon the troopship Ormiston. The battalion was disbanded shortly after their disembarkation in Australia. During the war, the battalion lost 17 men killed in action or died on active service, while another 18 men were wounded. Members of the battalion received the following decorations: one Military Medal and 12 Mentions in Despatches. For its service during the war, the 35th was awarded three battle honours in 1961.

== Battle honours ==
The 35th Battalion received the following battle honours:

- First World War: Messines 1917, Ypres 1917, Polygon Wood, Broodseinde, Poelcappelle, Passchendaele, Somme 1918, Ancre 1918, Amiens, Albert 1918, Mont St Quentin, Hindenburg Line, St Quentin Canal, and France and Flanders 1916–18.
- Second World War: Sio–Sepik River, South-West Pacific 1944–45, Liberation of Australian New Guinea.

== Commanding officers ==
The following officers served as commanding officers of the 35th Battalion:

- First World War:
  - Lieutenant Colonel Grantley Andrew Holborrow;
  - Lieutenant Colonel Henry Arthur Goddard;
  - Lieutenant Colonel Harold Fletcher White.
- Second World War:
  - Lieutenant Colonel Frederick Henry Montgomery Armstrong;
  - Lieutenant Colonel Eugene William Egan;
  - Lieutenant Colonel Douglas Frank Rae.

== Notes ==
Footnotes

Citations
