= Battle of Morlancourt =

Battle of Morlancourt may refer to:

- First Battle of Morlancourt: an action of World War I fought over the period 28–30 March 1918
- Second Battle of Morlancourt: a series of raids carried out by Australian forces around Morlancourt, and a subsequent German counter-attack, over the period 4–14 May 1918
- Third Battle of Morlancourt: an attack by Australian forces on the Morlancourt spur on 10 June 1918
