= 44th Battalion (Australia) =

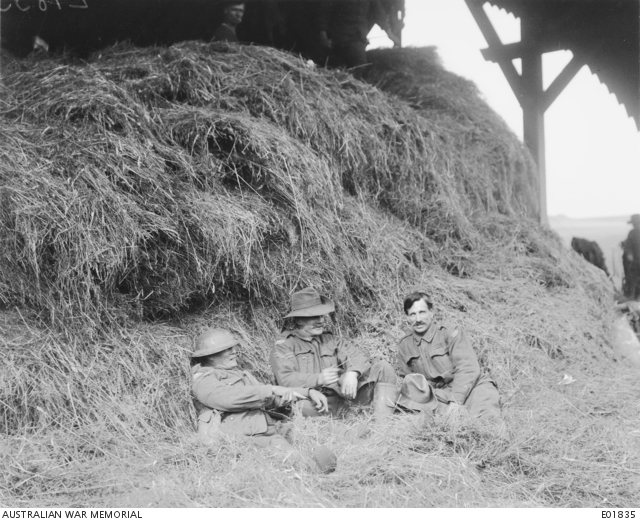
- Troops from the 44th rest near Bonnay, after fighting there during the German Spring Offensive, April 1918
- Active: 1916–1919; 1921–1944
- Country: Australia
- Branch: Australian Army
- Type: Infantry
- Size: ~900–1,000 men
- Part of: 11th Brigade; 13th Brigade
- Nickname: The West Australian Rifles
- Motto: In Hoc Signo Vinces
- Engagements: First World War: Western Front

Insignia
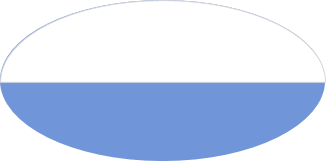
- Unit colour patch

The 44th Battalion was an infantry unit of the Australian Army. Originally formed in 1916 for overseas service during World War I, the battalion fought in the trenches along the Western Front in France and Belgium between late 1916 and 1918, before disbanding at the conclusion of hostilities. During the inter-war years, the 44th became part of the part-time Citizens Force, based in Western Australia. During World War II, it undertook garrison duties in Australia but was not deployed overseas to fight. In the post-World War II period the 44th was amalgamated with the 11th Battalion, before being subsumed into the Royal Western Australia Regiment in 1960.

== History ==
=== World War I ===
Raised at Claremont, Western Australia, in February 1916, the battalion formed part of the 11th Brigade, which was part of the 3rd Division, which was formed as part of an expansion of the all-volunteer Australian Imperial Force (AIF) that took place at the end of the failed Gallipoli Campaign. Its first commanding officer was Lieutenant Colonel William Mansbridge. After a period of training in Australia, in June 1916 the 44th, with an authorised strength of 1,023 men, embarked on the transport Suevic, and was transported to the United Kingdom where the 3rd Division underwent a further period of training on Salisbury Plain before crossing the English Channel to France in November 1916, where they joined the other four infantry divisions of the AIF. The following month, the battalion entered the front line for the first time. Throughout the winter of 1916–17, the battalion rotated between manning the front line, and conducting training or manual labour in the rear areas.

Their first taste of combat on the Western Front came on 13 March 1917, when half the battalion was committed to a major raid, which ultimately proved unsuccessful. For the next two years, the 44th Battalion fought in the trenches along the Western Front, taking part in a number of significant battles, the first of which came around Messines in early June 1917. The battalion received in a new commanding officer in August, when Lieutenant Colonel James Clark took over from Mansbridge; he would subsequently command the battalion until the end of the war. In late October 1917, the battalion fought around Broodseinde Ridge, where it suffered heavily – out of 992 men committed, only 158 finished the battle uninjured. After wintering in Belgium, in early 1918, the 44th was moved south to the Somme Valley after the Germans launched their Spring Offensive, during which it undertook defensive operations in front of the vital railhead of Amiens, including repelling a German attack around Morlancourt.

After the German offensive was blunted, a lull period followed during which the Allies slowly sought to gain the initiative, undertaking several "Peaceful Penetration" operations. In July, the 44th took part in the Battle of Hamel, assigned the task of flanking the village to the north and south in support of the 43rd Battalion. In August, the 44th joined the Allied Hundred Days Offensive after which it took part in several attacks against the Hindenburg Line in the final months of the war. Its final battle came in early October 1918, at the Battle of the St Quentin Canal. By the time it was withdrawn for rest, it was down to just 80 men and it did not return to the line before the war came to an end in November 1918; total casualties during the war amounted to 437 killed and 1,346 wounded. A total of nine drafts of reinforcements were sent to the battalion between June 1916 and July 1917. The 44th Battalion received 15 battle honours for its involvement in the fighting on the Western Front; these were bestowed in 1927.

In 1920, returned servicemen founded the 44th Battalion Band, a brass band which eventually received sponsorship from the WA Department of Fire and Emergency Services, and now performs as the Western Australia Fire and Emergency Services Concert Band.

=== Inter-war years and World War II ===
Following the end of the war, the 44th Battalion was eventually disbanded as part of the demobilisation of the AIF. In 1921, Australia's part-time military force was reorganised to perpetuate the numerical designations and divisional structure of the AIF, and as a result the 44th Battalion was re-raised at this time, based in Western Australia, drawing personnel from the 16th, 28th and 51st Infantry Regiments. Through its link with these units, the battalion inherited the theatre honour "South Africa 1899–1902". During the inter-war years, the battalion formed part of the 13th Brigade, which was headquartered in Perth, and was part of the 5th Military District. Despite the widespread Defence cutbacks that occurred in the 1920s and 1930s, the battalion remained in existence throughout the Great Depression, even when other units were amalgamated as manpower became scarce. In 1927, when territorial titles were introduced, the battalion adopted the title of the "West Australian Rifles"; it also formed an alliance with the Essex Regiment and In Hoc Signo Vinces was adopted as the battalion's motto. The majority of the battalion was based in Perth during this time, but a single company was raised at Bunbury.

At the outbreak of World War II, the provisions of the Defence Act initially precluded Militia units from being sent overseas to fight. As a result, the 44th Battalion remained in Australia to undertake garrison duty, and even though it was later gazetted as an AIF unit after the majority of its personnel volunteered to do so, it was never deployed overseas. In early 1942, the 44th Battalion was detached from the 13th Brigade and assigned to the Special Mobile Force that was formed to respond in the event of a Japanese raid against installations in Western Australia. In June 1944, the battalion was disbanded, though, as the Japanese threat had passed and the Australian military sought to redress an manpower shortage in other areas. After the war, the battalion was not re-raised in its own right, although it was formed as an amalgamated unit known as the "11th/44th Battalion (The City of Perth Regiment)". This unit remained in existence until 1960, when a reorganisation of the Citizens Military Force led to the creation of six multi-battalion state-based regiments, and the 11th/44th became subsumed into the Royal Western Australia Regiment.

== Battle honours ==
The 44th Battalion was awarded the following battle honours:

- South Africa 1899–1902 (inherited from predecessor units);
- First World War: Messines, 1917; Ypres, 1917; Polygon Wood; Broodseinde; Poelcappelle; Passchendaele; Somme, 1918; Ancre, 1918; Hamel; Amiens; Albert, 1918; Mont St. Quentin; Hindenburg Line; St. Quentin Canal; and France and Flanders, 1916–18.

== Memorial ==
In March 2024, the 44th Battalion Memorial was founded by Luca Muir Anderson. On 27 March, the Mayor of Claremont signed a re-created banner, as his predecessor did in 1916. On ANZAC Day 2024, the Battalion's banner was marched in Perth for the first time in many years. On 23 November of that year, a large dawn to dusk commemoration ceremony was held at Perth War Cemetery, with the Governor of WA and numerous significant military figures in attendance.
