= Second Battle of Morlancourt =

World War I Battle

- Part of Operation Michael (German spring offensive)
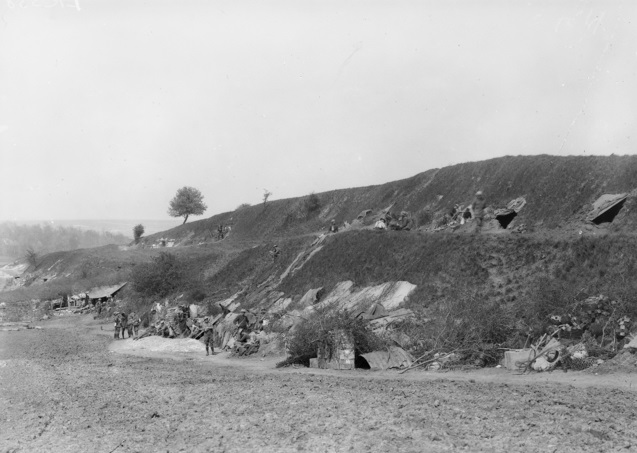
- Headquarters troops from the 35th Battalion near Morlancourt, 9 May 1918
Date	4–14 May 1918
Location	Morlancourt, France 49°57′06″N 2°37′46″E
Result	Allied victory

Belligerents
Australia; United Kingdom	German Empire

Commanders and leaders
(Australia) John Monash (Australia) Charles Rosenthal	Unknown

Units involved
(Australia) 3rd Division	(German Empire) 199th Division

Casualties and losses
324 killed and wounded	218 captured Unknown killed and wounded
- Morlancourt, a commune in the Somme department, northern France

The Second Battle of Morlancourt was fought over the period 4–14 May 1918, on the Western Front during World War I. The battle took place during the final stages of the German spring offensive. The battle began as a peaceful penetration action launched over several days by troops from the Australian 9th Brigade, to advance their lines around Morlancourt through a series of small raids against the opposing German 199th Division. Afterwards, both sides rotated their forces in the area and the Germans subsequently launched a counter-attack against the Australian 5th Brigade. This attack was eventually repulsed and the line held until June, when the Third Battle of Morlancourt took place around Morlancourt as the Australians secured the Morlancourt spur to consolidate their positions on the Somme before the Allied Hundred Days Offensive.

== Background ==
Situated on the northern bank of the River Somme, Morlancourt is about 26 kilometres (16 mi) north-east of Amiens, in the Somme department of northern France. The battle took place against the backdrop of the German spring offensive, which saw the Germans launch an offensive on the Western Front that had rapidly gained ground through the Somme after it had commenced on 21 March. In late March, troops from the Australian 3rd Division had clashed with the German 18th Division in the First Battle of Morlancourt, when the Australians advanced to fill a gap in the Allied line that had formed north of the River Somme as the Germans had continued their advance towards the railhead at Amiens. The Australian advance was checked just short of their objective, the cross spur overlooking Morlancourt. In April, the Germans had launched a thrust south of Ypres towards the railhead at Hazebrouck and the channel coast during the Battle of the Lys.

By April, the Australian 3rd Division's line between the Somme and the Ancre, representing a frontage of around 7,000 yards (6,400 m) had advanced very little since the First Battle of Morlancourt. To improve command and control along the front, on 22 April the two Australian divisions holding the line in the area – the 3rd and the 5th – were reorganised, pushing their boundaries further north, so that the two rivers were incorporated inside the lines of the same formation, rather than being sitting astride them. The 10th Brigade (Brigadier General Walter McNicoll) of the 3rd Division took over some of the line previously held by the 7th Brigade, 2nd Division. They began working to advance their line forward north of the Ancre as the line in this sector was nearly 1 mile (1.6 km) behind the line on the south side.

== Battle ==
In late April, the 11th Brigade (Brigadier General James Cannan), which held the line south of the 10th Brigade, was relieved. Their replacements were the 9th Brigade (Brigadier General Charles Rosenthal). This brigade had been detached from the 3rd Division earlier and had taken part in the fighting during the First Battle of Villers-Bretonneux. Due to heavy casualties, the 9th Brigade had been reduced to three battalions: 33rd, 34th and 35th Battalions. Its fourth battalion, the 36th had been disbanded to provide reinforcements to the other battalions in the brigade. It had been given two weeks' rest before being rotated into the line, where they assumed a position between the 10th Brigade on their left and the 5th Division's 8th Brigade on their right.

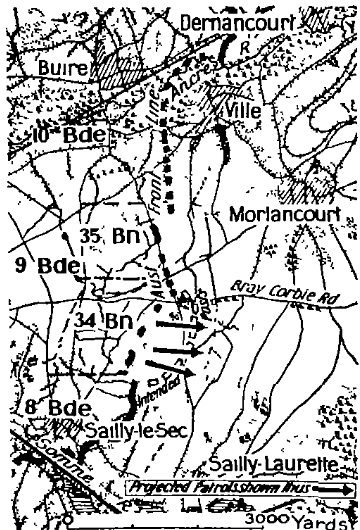
Map depicting Australian positions between the Somme and Ancre during the battle

On 29 April, while touring the front, it had become apparent to Rosenthal that his brigade's outpost positions on his right were isolated and vulnerable due to a series of sunken roads, vegetation and other terrain features that provide cover for a German surprise attack. Rosenthal decided it was necessary to push his line forward across the valley to the next slope. The 34th Battalion, holding the southern part of the 9th Brigade area, was detailed for the task. They would be supported by the 3rd Pioneers and fatigue parties from the 33rd Battalion, to dig trenches and lay out wire obstacles. The 35th Battalion, holding the northern part of the brigade front, would clear several German positions in front of its line to the protect the flank of the 34th Battalion. Direct fire support was provided by the 10th Machine Gun Company, while the 9th Light Trench Mortar Battery provided indirect fire support.

Between 4 and 9 May, the Australians attempted to capture the German front line positions around Morlancourt, which were held mainly by troops from the 237th Reserve Infantry Regiment, 199th Division. Using peaceful penetration tactics, the Australians launched raids over several nights. The raids proved largely successful, except for an abortive attempt on 7 May, when the late issuing of orders resulted in a hasty and poorly co-ordinated operation that resulted in a company from the 34th Battalion – with reinforcements from the 33rd – being cut off, after having broken into positions held by the German 114th Infantry Regiment. Surrounded on each flank, when daylight came, the company was forced to surrender. The raids succeeded in advancing the Australian line 1.00 mile (1.61 km). Casualties during the fighting in the first part of May amounted to 264 killed or wounded for the Australians and at least 170 Germans captured.

After the loss of their front line positions, the Germans reinforced their positions around Morlancourt. The 31st Infantry Regiment was detached from the 18th Division and loaned to the 199th Division, moving into the line around the Bray–Corbie Road. The Australians also rotated their forces, with the 2nd Division relieving the 3rd, who had been in the line for almost seven weeks. On 11 May, the area around Morlancourt was assigned to the 5th Brigade, consisting of the 17th, 18th, 19th and 20th Battalions, which had been out of the line resting. As the 2nd Division's 6th Brigade began preparing to capture Ville to the north, the 5th Brigade began sending out patrols opposite Morlancourt, securing several prisoners and machine guns.

Throughout 13 May, efforts were made to locate a German outpost opposite the 17th Battalion and at 3:00 am the following day 4.5-inch howitzers from the 107th and 108th Batteries shelled the position. A patrol was then sent out to ascertain the effect of the shelling but it was turned back by heavy machine gun fire, which confirmed that it was still intact. At 3:45 am, the Germans retaliated with a heavy artillery bombardment against the 17th Battalion's positions around the Bray–Corbie Road. Following this, the Germans launched a counter-attack against the 5th Brigade with 200 troops, seeking to regain some of the positions lost to the 34th Battalion during the earlier Australian raids. The attack overran several Australian posts before it was checked and then after a heavy mortar barrage, the three forward Australian companies launched their own counter-attack which subsequently cleared the trenches and released the Australians that had been temporarily taken prisoner. By 10:30 am the fighting had concluded with another 48 soldiers from the German 31st Infantry Regiment being captured. Against this, the Australians had lost a further 60 men killed or wounded.

== Aftermath ==
Following the failed counter-attack, the Germans rotated their forces along the Morlancourt front, bringing the 107th Division into the line, while throughout 15 May the German artillery fired a heavy bombardment of the Australian lines. Minor actions continued along the line until 18 May as the 18th Battalion sought to shore up its left flank. This included a daylight raid across no man's land, during which the Australians took advantage of the heat of the day when many of the German sentries were asleep, to surprise a German position. The Australians reached their objective without a shot being fired. After the Australians threw a grenade, the remaining Germans in the trench surrendered. There was a brief exchange of fire with a neighbouring position, which was quickly overcome before the raiding party returned to their lines. A total of 22 Germans were captured in the raid. Elsewhere, in late May, the Germans launched the third major blow of their Spring Offensive, attacking the French in Third Battle of the Aisne.

On 10 June 1918, the day after the Germans launched an attack aimed at the Montdidier–Compiegne–Soissons railway, a third battle took place around Morlancourt. This saw the Australian 7th Brigade capture the Morlancourt spur, which overlooked village of Sailly-Laurette, to the south of Morlancourt. The Australians then worked to consolidate their position ahead of further actions on the Somme, including the Battle of Hamel in early July. Capture of the spur completed the process which had begun with the earlier two battles and helped the Allies set the conditions required for further actions prior to the final Hundred Days Offensive. The final Allied offensive began in August 1918 and ended the war. As a result of the final battle, 325 Germans were taken prisoner, while the Australians lost 400 killed or wounded.
