= 2nd Division (Australia) =

One of two divisions of the Australian Army

- Active: 1915–1919; 1921–1944; 1948–1960; 1965–present
- Country: Australia
- Branch: Australian Army Reserve
- Type: Reserve division
- Role: Homeland Defence
- Size: 5 brigades
- Garrison/HQ: Sydney, New South Wales
- March: 'Pozieres' (arr Allis)
- Engagements: World War I: Gallipoli campaign; Western Front; World War II: Defence of Australia

Commanders
- Current commander: Major General Matt Burr, AM
- Notable commanders: Sir Charles Rosenthal; Iven Mackay; Herbert Lloyd; Kathryn Campbell

Insignia
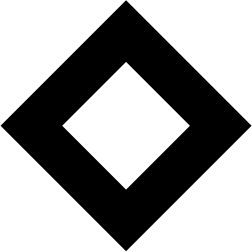
- Unit colour patch

The 2nd (Australian) Division is a Reserve division that is headquartered in Randwick Barracks, Sydney. The primary role of the Division is homeland defence. Its formations are geographically dispersed across Australia and include the 4th Brigade in Victoria and Tasmania, the 5th Brigade in New South Wales, the 9th Brigade in South Australia, the 11th Brigade in Queensland and the 13th Brigade in Western Australia. The Division also commands the Regional Force Surveillance Group that provides remote-area, land and littoral surveillance and reconnaissance capability in Australia’s North and North-West.

The division was first formed in Egypt in July 1915 during World War I as part of the First Australian Imperial Force (1st AIF). The division took part in the Gallipoli campaign, arriving in the latter stages and then traversed to the Western Front in France and Belgium where it had the distinction of taking part in the final ground action fought by Australian troops in the war. After the war ended and the AIF was demobilised, the 2nd Division name was revived and assigned to a Citizens Military Forces (reserve) unit in 1921.

During the inter-war years, the division was based in New South Wales with its headquarters Parramatta. During World War II, the 2nd Division undertook defensive duties on the east coast until mid-1942 when it was sent to Western Australia. In May 1944, the division was disbanded as the war situation no longer required large numbers of garrison troops to be held back in Australia. Post war, the division was re-raised in 1948, and except for a period from 1960 to 1965, the division has existed in one form or another since then.

== World War I ==
=== Gallipoli, 1915 ===
The Australian 2nd Division was formed from reinforcements training in Egypt on 26 July 1915 as part of the Australian Imperial Force, which has been raised to fight in World War I. The division was formed from three brigades – the 5th, 6th and 7th – that had been raised independently in Australia (in February and April 1915), and sent to Egypt (in May and June 1915) for further training. Initially, it was intended that the division's commander would be James McCay, but he was wounded on 11 July, and repatriated back to Australia after the death of both his wife and father. As a result, the command of the division went to Lieutenant-General Gordon Legge.

Due to the pressing need for more soldiers for the Gallipoli campaign, parts of the 2nd Division was sent to Anzac Cove in mid-August 1915, despite the fact that the division was only partially trained. There, they reinforced the 1st Division and the New Zealand and Australian Division. The rest of the division arrived by early September. The 2nd Division held a quiet stretch of the original line (as a majority of the fighting was taking place north of ANZAC Cove), and only a part of the division (the 18th Battalion) saw serious fighting during around Hill 60 on 22 August. The 2nd Division was evacuated from the peninsula in December, returning to Egypt, where it completed its training and formation while the 1st Division was split and used to raise two new divisions (the 4th and 5th) as the AIF was expanded prior to its departure to Europe to fight on the Western Front. A pioneer battalion, designated the 2nd Pioneer Battalion, was added to the division at this time.

=== Somme, 1916 ===
The 2nd Division started to arrive in France in March 1916. In April, it was sent (as part of the I Anzac Corps with the Australian 1st Division) to a quiet sector south of Armentières to acclimatise to the Western Front conditions. In mid-July, with the British offensive on the Somme dragging on, I Anzac Corps was sent to join the British Reserve Army of Lieutenant General Hubert Gough who intended to use the Australian divisions to take the village of Pozières. Due to the casualties sustained by the Australian 1st Division's attack at Pozières on 23 July, it was replaced by the 2nd Division on 27 July. Continuing the effort started by the 1st Division, the 2nd Division attacked on 29 July. However, due to the hurried preparation, the troops forming up for the attack were detected and the supporting artillery proved inadequate, leaving large segments of wire in front of the German position intact. The division sustained approximately 3,500 casualties for little gain.

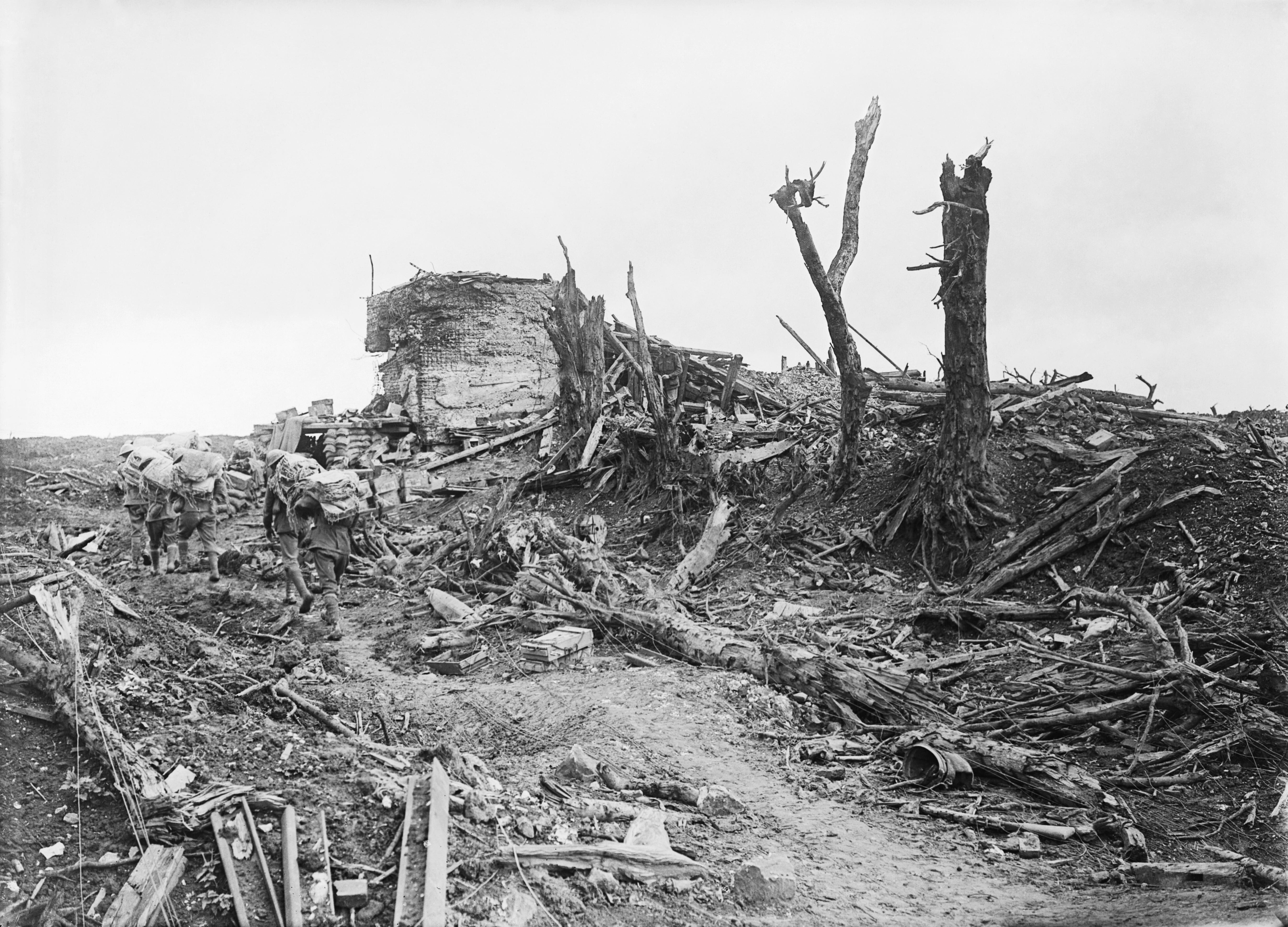
7th Brigade fatigue party passing the "Gibraltar" bunker, Pozières, August 1916.

After several days of disrupted preparations, the 2nd Division attacked again in the evening of 4 August, capturing the OG2 trench line and part of the crest. Alarmed by the loss of the defences (including the crest), the Germans initiated a counter-attack the following day, which the Australians repulsed. This was followed by a severe, sustained artillery bombardment that inflicted heavy casualties. The position of the Australian salient meant that the soldiers received artillery fire from the front, flank and rear – including from German batteries near Thiepval. After 12 days on the front line and sustaining 6,846 casualties, the 2nd Division was relieved by the Australian 4th Division on 6 August.

After a brief rest, the 2nd Division again relieved the Australian 1st Division from its position beyond Pozières (in front of Mouquet Farm) on 22 August (the Battle of Mouquet Farm). Attacking on 26 August, the 2nd Division succeeded in penetrating past the fortifications at Mouquet Farm only to be attacked from the rear as troops from the German Guards Reserve Corps emerged from the fortified underground positions at Mouquet Farm. These counterattacks succeeded in forcing the 2nd Division back from Mouquet Farm. After sustaining another 1,268 casualties, the 2nd Division was relieved by the Australian 4th Division on 26 August.

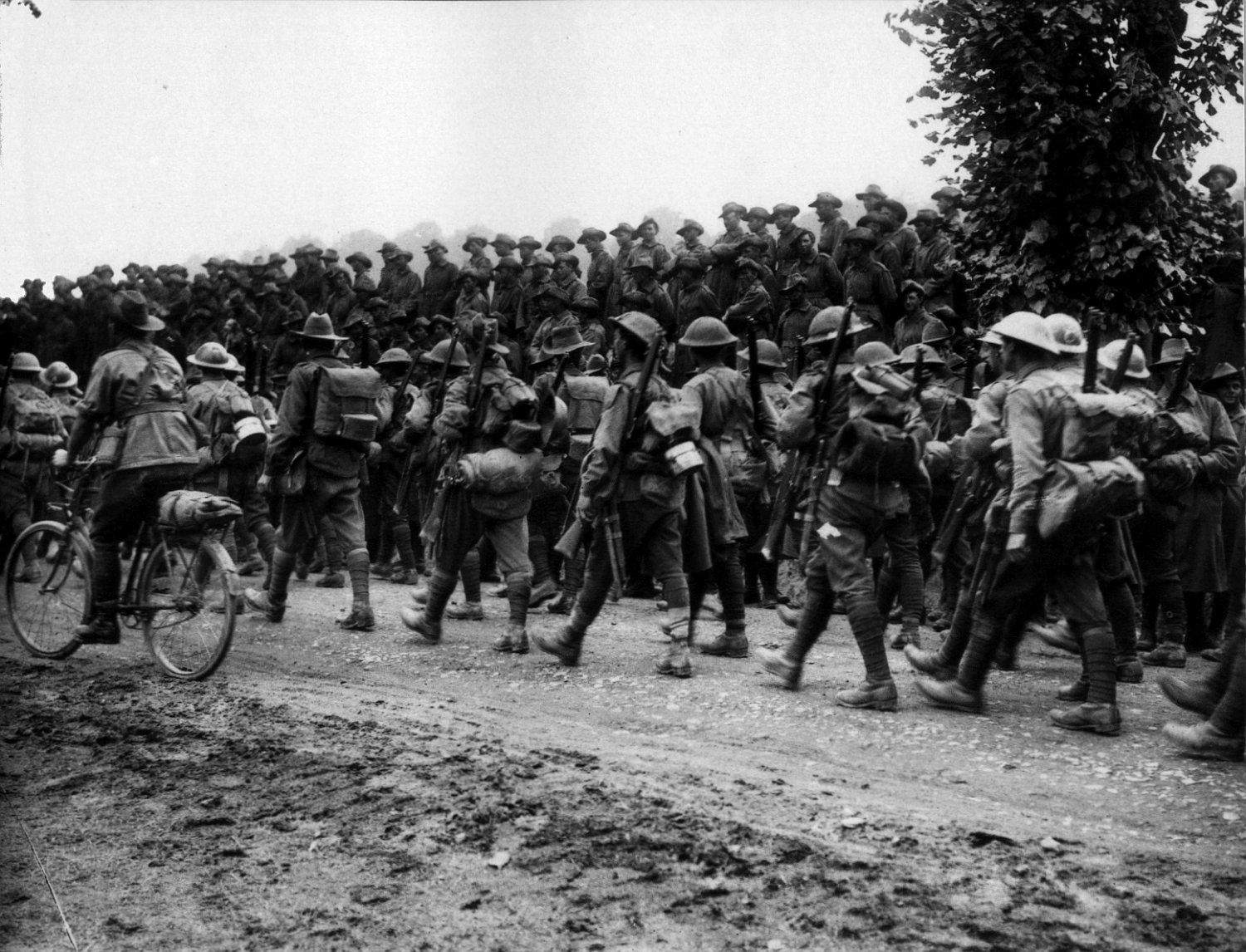
Remnants of the 6th Brigade returning from Pozières, August 1916.

On 5 September, I Anzac was withdrawn from the Somme and sent to Ypres for rest. The division anticipated spending winter in Flanders. Throughout early October, the division undertook a number of minor raids in the sector, but in the middle of the month it was relieved by the British 21st Division and was recalled to the Somme for the final stages of the British offensive. This time they joined the British Fourth Army, holding a sector south of Pozières near the village of Flers. Despite heavy mud, the Australians were required to mount a number of attacks around Gueudecourt, with a brigade from the 2nd Division and a brigade from the 1st Division. On 5 November, the 7th Brigade attacking the German series of trenches called "The Maze". While part of the German trenches were captured and held, the exhausted soldiers were ejected from their gains a few days later. Two battalions of the 7th Brigade, along with two battalions from the 5th, attacked again on 14 November, but they were only partially successful in capturing parts of the "Gird" and "Gird Support" trenches immediately to the north of "The Maze". However, a German counterattack on 16 November succeeded in recapturing all of the trenches captured by the 2nd Division, which had sustained 1,720 casualties in the two attacks.

=== German withdrawal to the Hindenburg Line, 1917 ===
In January 1917, Legge fell ill and was replaced by Major-General Nevill Maskelyne Smyth VC who had formerly commanded the Australian 1st Brigade since during the Gallipoli campaign. Legge returned to Australia to take up the post of Inspector General. However, until Smyth was available, the division was temporarily commanded by the 6th Brigade commander, Brigadier-General John Gellibrand. During this period, the division took part in the operations on the Ancre, participating in the capture of Thilloys. The 2nd Division was relieved by the Australian 5th Division; however, by late February (during the German withdrawal to the prepared fortifications in the Hindenburg Line), elements of the 2nd Division were active in engaging the German rearguard as it fell back to the first fortified reserve position known to the British as the Loupart-Le Transloy Line, or the R.I. Stellung by the Germans. The Germans had decided to temporarily hold the R.I. position, which was centred on the village of Bapaume, so on 25 February, the 5th and 6th Brigades mounted an unsuccessful attack on the "Malt" trench – an outpost in front of the R.I. position.

Continual small attacks were conducted on the Malt Trench through 26 and 27 February, with a larger attack attempted on the 27th and 28th by the 7th Brigade. However, as the wire defences were undamaged, little headway could be made. It was not until 2 March, when a combined attack was put in with the 5th and 7th Brigades, and after sustained artillery fire had cut paths through the wire, that the 7th Brigade captured portions of Malt trench. This brought the 2nd Division close enough to be able to attack the R.I. position. As the 2nd Division was preparing to attack the R.I. position in front of Loupart Wood (the attack was planned to commence on 13 March), it was discovered on 12 March, that the Germans had already withdrawn to the second reserve position R.II. Stellung centred on the crest of the ridge beyond Bapaume. R.II. was evacuated by the Germans on 17 March, as they withdrew to the Hindenburg Line.

Starting on 17 March 1917, the 2nd Division was reorganised to pursue the German withdrawal, with the 6th Brigade chosen to lead the pursuit. On 20 March, the 6th Brigade attempted a hasty attack on the fortified village of Noreuil, which was beaten back with over 300 casualties. However, the next attack on the fortified village of Lagnicourt on 26 March was successful, with the German counter-attack on the same day defeated by the Australians. Soon after, the 2nd Division was relieved by Australian 4th Division. This formation conducted a second attack on the fortified village of Noreuil, which was captured on 2 April. With the capture of Noreuil (Louverval and Doignies were also taken by the Australian 5th Division on 2 April), the I Anzac Corps was within striking distance of the main Hindenburg defences.

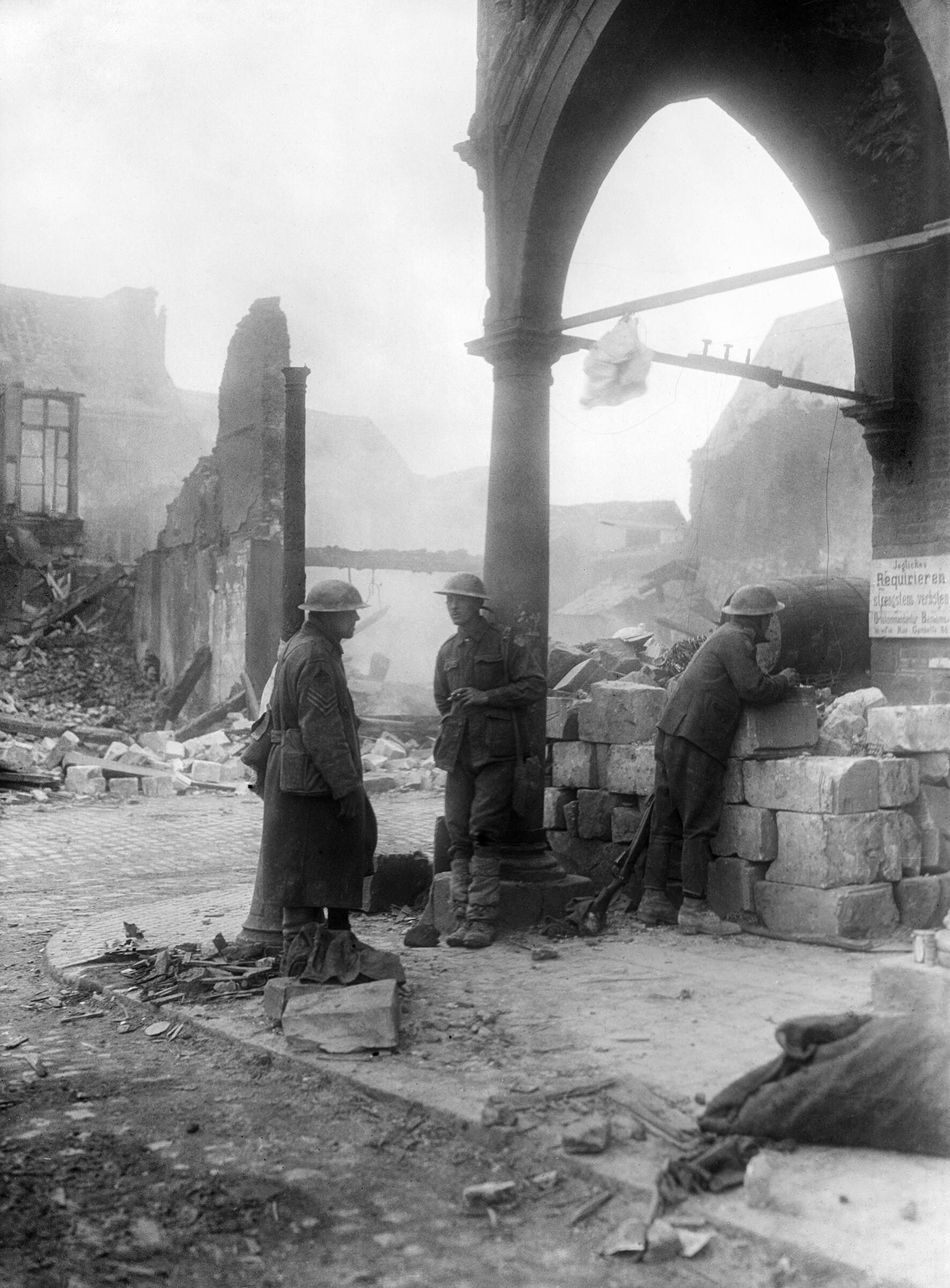
2nd Division troops in Bapaume, March 1917

=== Hindenburg Line, 1917 ===
The 2nd Division was in support during the First Battle of Bullecourt, which was the Fifth Army's main contribution to the Arras offensive. Once the first attempt on Bullecourt had failed, the 2nd Division relieved the Australian 4th Division from in front of Bullecourt (a front of approximately 2,750 yd (2,510 m) on 13 April.

As such, when the Germans launched a counter-stroke on 15 April in front of the village of Lagnicourt (the Battle of Lagnicourt), part of it fell on the 17th Battalion (which was holding the right flank of the 2nd Division), with the remainder falling on the 1st Division. The attack was strongest along the divisional boundary between the 1st and 2nd Divisions, and as a result the Germans managed to penetrate between the 17th Battalion and the neighbouring 12th Battalion and capture the village of Lagnicourt. Counterattacks by the 5th Brigade (2nd Division) and 3rd Brigade (1st Division) managed to drive off the attacking Germans, and re-establish the original front line. During this battle, the 2nd Division experienced 305 casualties (of the 1,010 casualties experienced by the I Anzac Corps).

On 3 May, the Second Battle of Bullecourt commenced with the 2nd Division – committing the 5th and 6th Brigades – attacking the two trench lines east of Bullecourt. The 5th Brigade made little progress, but the 6th Brigade seized parts of both trench lines. Heavy counterattacks then fell against the 6th Brigade. To secure the 6th Brigade's left flank, the 7th Brigade, as the divisional reserve attacked. The 6th Brigade held its position against numerous counterattacks, until relieved by elements of the 1st Division on 4 May. As they were withdrawn, a fourth counter-attack fell on the area, at which point the 6th rejoined the battle, helping to blunt this assault before finally departing. Further attacks were conducted on 4 May and 6 May by brigades of the Australian 1st Division that were attached to the 2nd Division, supported by elements of the 2nd Division, resulted in the capture of most of the first line of trenches. After repulsing a total of six German counterattacks, the 5th Division arrived on 8/9 May, continuing the fighting until 17 May. For its part, the fighting around Bullecourt had cost the 2nd Division 3,898 casualties.

=== Third Battle of Ypres, 1917 ===
The 2nd Division was then sent to rest areas in the Somme region for reorganisation and training. The 2nd Division's artillery was in action from the start of the Third Battle of Ypres on 22 July 1917, supporting the British 24th Division, but the infantry were not called upon until the second phase of the battle commenced on 20 September with the Battle of Menin Road. Attacking along an 8-mile (13 km) front with ten other divisions, including the Australian 1st Division on their right and the 9th (Scottish) Division on their left, the 2nd Division advanced an average of 1,000 yards (910 m), with the 5th Brigade on the left, and the 7th on the right. The division sustained 2,259 casualties, and was relieved on 22 September by the Australian 4th Division, which then continued the offensive in the next the Battle of Polygon Wood.

Relieving the British 3rd Infantry Division between 29 September and 1 October, the 2nd Division's task in the Battle of Broodseinde was to advance 1,800 to 1,900 yd (1,600 to 1,700 m), and to capture one of the ridgelines which dominated the Ypres Salient. On 4 October, as the division was forming up for its attack, a heavy German bombardment fell on their assembly area, causing heavy casualties. A German attack then started at almost the same time as the Australian attack, resulting in the two attacking forces engaging each other in no-man's land. After gaining the upper hand, the 2nd Division captured all of its objectives, sustaining 2,174 casualties. This battle marked the peak of British success during 3rd Ypres, and with rain starting to fall on 3 October, was the last successful action of the battle.

With the rain becoming heavier, the conditions on the ground deteriorated. When the next attack (the Battle of Poelcappelle) started on 9 October the ground became difficult to traverse, resulting in difficulty bringing artillery and ammunition forward, and the troops becoming exhausted moving up to their starting positions prior to the start of the attack The 2nd Division's role was for the left brigade to advance to protect the flank of the 66th (2nd East Lancashire) Division. With the 6th and 7th Brigades heavily understrength (just 600 and 800 men each), and supported by a weak artillery barrage, the advance quickly stalled, and resulted in only small gains at a cost of 1,253 casualties. As a result of the exhaustion of the troops, the 2nd Division was relieved for the final effort around Passchendaele on 12 October.

The 2nd Division relieved the Australian 5th Division on 27 October, and continued to hold the line along the Broodseinde Ridge, conducting patrols into no man's land, until all of the Australian divisions (grouped into an all Australian Corps from November 1917) were transferred south to Flanders, centred on the town of Messines, where they spent the winter. During this period, the 2nd Division occupied the front around Ploegsteert, in the southern part of the Australian line, during December 1917 – January 1918, and then again in March – April 1918. On 3 April, the division was relieved by the British 25th Division.

=== German Spring Offensive, 1918 ===
On 21 March, the Germans launched their Spring Offensive, focused on the Somme. As the offensive, began to threaten the vital rail hub of Amiens, the Australians were hurriedly brought south to help restore the British line in the Somme. Upon reaching the Somme on 4 April, the leading brigade (the 5th) was detached to relieve the troops around Villers-Bretonneux, while the rest of the division (under the command of the British Third Army) relieved the Australian 4th Division, which had just fought the First and Second Battles of Dernancourt. The detached 5th Brigade (under the command of the British Fourth Army) was initially put into a reserve line (the "Aubigny Line") under the 14th Division, before it was sent to support (and later relieve) the 18th Division south of Villers-Bretonneux.

After the 5th Brigade had relieved the 18th Division on 5 April, it was decided that the 5th would recapture the lost parts of Hangard wood, and so reduce a salient that threatened the southern flank of the Australian forces at Villers-Bretonneux. The attack by two battalions – the 19th and 20th – was conducted on 7 April, and while it succeeded in clearing Hangard Wood (at a cost of 151 casualties), the position that the attacking troops were expected to fortify was poorly sited, and as a result the attacking troops retreated to their starting positions.

Another attack was planned, this time in conjunction with the French First Army, with the objective of eliminating the entire salient south of Villers-Bretonneux. However, when the next stage of German offensive (the Battle of Lys) started on 9 April, it drew off the British forces required to mount the attack. In addition, German attacks on 7 and 12 April had captured of the village of Hangard, and led to the abandonment of the Allied attack. However, it was decided that a small local attack would be mounted on 15 April, with the intention of capturing the cemetery and a copse north of Hangard village. One battalion – the 18th – from the 5th Brigade was to capture the copse, while the French secured the cemetery. In the end, the failure of the French attack ultimately undermined the Australian position in the copse, which eventually fell to German counterattacks (with a total of 84 casualties). The 5th Brigade returned to the Australian Corps on 19 April.

=== Peaceful penetration operations, 1918 ===
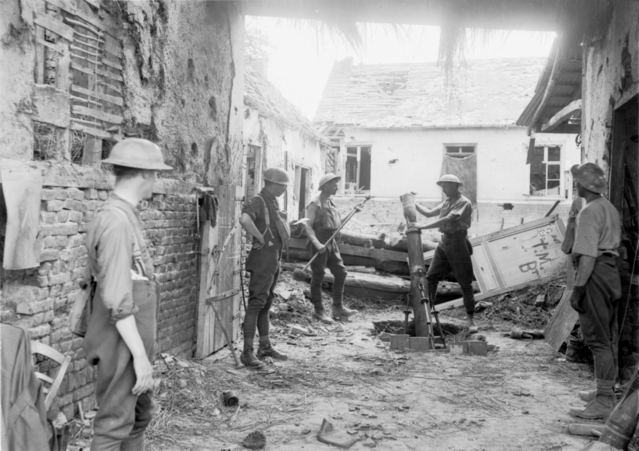
3rd Medium Trench Mortar Battery in action, Ville-sur-Ancre 29 May 1918

As the Spring Offensive ground to a halt, the 2nd Division was relieved by the 47th Division on 2 May, and became the reserve division for the Australian Corps. After resting, the division relieved the Australian 3rd Division opposite Morlancourt on 11 May, and continued the peaceful penetration operations that had been started by the 3rd Division during the Second Battle of Morlancourt. On 19 May, elements of the division (mostly from 6th Brigade) attacked the Germans on either side of the village of Ville-sur-Ancre (an advance of approximately 1,000 yards (910 m)). Despite coming up against fresh troops who were anticipating the attack, the Australians succeeded in capturing the village, albeit at cost of 418 casualties. Against this, the Germans suffered 800 casualties, as well as 330 prisoners and 45 machine guns.

On 22 May, Major General Charles Rosenthal, who had previously commanded the 9th Brigade, replaced Smyth as the 2nd Division commander. On 10 June, the 7th Brigade conducted an attack over a 3,000 yards (2,700 m) frontage between Morlancourt and Sailly-Laurette during the Third Battle of Morlancourt, and succeeded in advancing an average depth of 700 yards (640 m), with approximately 350 casualties and the capture of 325 Germans, 30 machineguns and six trench mortars. This attack revealed the ease in which a well-planned attack could be conducted, and also revealed that there was no major offensive planned on the Amiens front.

As a result of the advances by the Australian Corps in front of Morlancourt, the southern flank was exposed to artillery fire from near the village of Hamel. In response to this and to provide support for a French attack south of Villers-Bretonneux, it was decided to attack the German salient and capture the village of Hamel as well as the Hamel and Vaire Woods. In preparation, the 2nd Division relieved the Australian 3rd Division on 28/29 June. The Australian divisions were heavily depleted, so it was decided that the upcoming Battle of Hamel would involve units from three Australian divisions (the 2nd, 3rd and 4th Australian Divisions), with the 2nd Division temporarily placing its left brigade (the 6th) under the command of the 4th Division for the attack. The 25th Battalion, detached from the 7th Brigade, also assisted.

The attack at Hamel, conducted on 4 July, was a complete success, with the battle completed in only 93 minutes. The 2nd Division troops temporarily attached to the Australian 4th Division suffered only 246 casualties (out of a total of 1,380 Australian and American casualties). The total German casualties for the battle were approximately 2,000, of which approximately 1,600 were captured), and included 177 machineguns and 32 trench mortars.

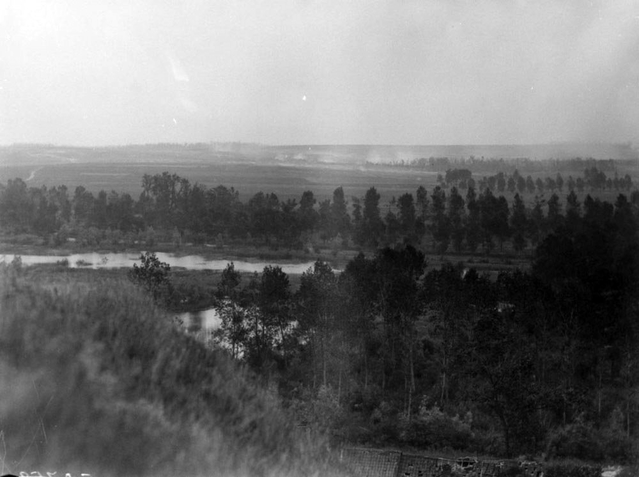
Hamel and the surrounding wood burning following the initial bombardment on 4 July 1918

The division continued peaceful penetration operations on its front and by 11 July had advanced its front line by approximately 200 yards (180 m). This aided a planned offensive whose objective was to capture more of the Villers-Bretonneux plateau. The continued peaceful penetrations on the northern flank of the salient below Villers-Bretonneux caused the Germans to withdraw by 1,000 yards (910 m), leaving only outposts and sentries behind to deceive the Allies that the front was still being held. This withdrawal meant that the Australians were able to capture Monument Farm and parts of Monument Wood. The 26th Battalion also secured a German tank ("Mephisto"), which had been disabled on 24 April. The withdrawal also meant that the planned offensive was now superseded, as peaceful penetration had already achieved the objectives.

Further patrols were conducted; this time with the objective of advancing the Australian 7th Brigade's front by 1,000 yards (910 m), and capturing the remainder of Monument Wood and "The Mound" (spoil from a nearby railway cutting). However, this would then expose the southern flank of the division. To counter this, Rosenthal approached the French commanders with a deal: the Australians would capture the ground, which would then be defended by French units. As the Germans were now starting to dig stronger fortifications, peaceful penetration was becoming more difficult to conduct. As a result, a small-scale attack was carried out on 17 July by only two battalions – the 25th and 26th – advancing the line by 500 yards (460 m) with 129 casualties, and inflicting at least 303 German casualties.

Due to their vulnerable southern flank, no further advances were possible until the French forces south of the 2nd Division advanced. French patrols on 18 July advanced their line, but it remained a mile behind the neighbouring 2nd Division. The peaceful penetration conducted over the previous two weeks had pushed the line forward by an average of 1,000 yards (910 m) over a frontage of 4,500 yards (4,100 m), at a cost of 437 casualties, and had achieved all of the objectives set down for the offensive that was to occur after the Battle of Hamel.

Between 26 July and 5 August, elements of the US 65th Infantry Brigade (from the 33rd Division) were assigned to the Australian Corps. Of these troops, two battalions of the US 129th Infantry Regiment were assigned to the 2nd Division, joining it around Villers-Bretonneux. One US company was allocated to each Australian battalion, and as some of the battalions were extremely under strength (for example, the front line strength of the 24th Battalion was only 193 men), it meant that there were equal numbers of Australians and Americans in the front line.

=== Hundred Days, 1918 ===
In August, the Allies launched their own (the start of the offensive, which ultimately ended the war. On 8 August, the 2nd Division commenced the Battle of Amiens, attacking (with the Australian 3rd Division) from its position near Villers-Bretonneux. The 2nd Division reached its objective (the "Green Line") between 6:25 and 7 am, and started to dig in. The second wave of Australian troops (the Australian 4th and 5th Divisions) moved through the 2nd and 3rd Divisions at 8:20 am, and continued on to the "Red Line". The soldiers of the 2nd Division held their positions (one brigade in the original front line, the other two brigades on the "Green Line"), digging in until released at 11:15 to rejoin the attack.

On 9–11 August, as part of the advance from Harbonnieres towards Lihons, the division continued its attack. Relieving the 5th Division, which had carried the first phase, the 5th and 7th Brigades, reinforced by the 2nd Brigade (from the 1st Division), carried the advance in the second phase. Over the course of several days, Vauvillers, Framerville and Rainecourt were captured at a cost of 1,295 casualties or the division. The attacks post 9 August were hastily planned, with limited knowledge of the tactical situation, and lacked co-ordination between neighbouring units and supporting artillery. While supporting tanks made up for some of this, their use was hampered by opposing artillery, resulting in a subsequent increase in casualties.

Between 16 and 18 August, another peaceful penetration operation was carried out by the 6th Brigade (then the only unit of the 2nd Division on the front line) around Herleville, culminating in an attack on 18 August to the edge of Herleville itself. By this stage the 6th Brigade had been heavily depleted – particularly from gas shelling around Villers-Bretonneux – to the extent that the 22nd Battalion's four companies were each at platoon strength; nevertheless, it attacked over a large frontage of 1,000 yards (910 m), losing a further 117 men. The 2nd Division was relieved on 19 August by the 32nd British Division.

After a short rest, the 2nd Division relieved the 1st Division on 26 August. As the Battle of Arras was to be the main effort of the British Expeditionary Force, General Henry Rawlinson (4th Army commander) ordered the Australians to maintain contact with the Germans while not being too aggressive. Nevertheless, the 2nd Division kept advancing along the south bank of the Somme River capturing various villages such as Herbécourt, Flaucourt, Barleux and – despite a stiff defence – Biaches. With German morale declining, the division was ordered to advance towards Péronne and Mont St. Quentin, with the intention of capturing Mont St. Quentin. The latter dominated the surrounding terrain, and was heavily fortified.

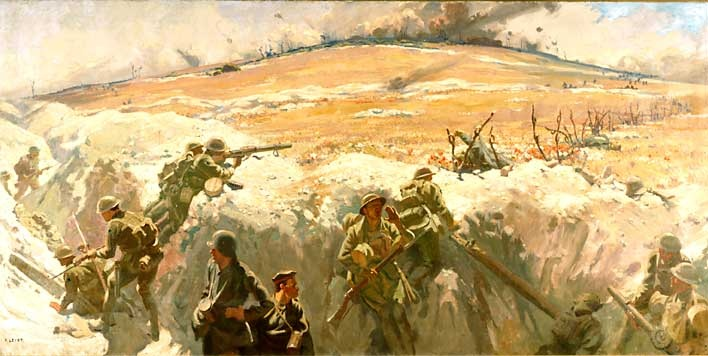
Capture of Mont Saint Quentin painting by Fred Leist (1920)

The initial plan for the Battle of Mont St. Quentin was for the 2nd Division, along with the Australian 3rd and the British 32nd Divisions, to attack to the east, and cross the Somme River near Péronne, before the 2nd Division continued on to take Mont St. Quentin. However, it was discovered that the defences along the river were too strong, and so the 2nd Division's front was taken over by the Australian 5th Division. The 2nd Division then moved north behind the Australian 3rd Division (which was to take Cléry and continue east to protect the 2nd Division's flank), approaching Mont St. Quentin on the northern side of the Somme River, before attacking Mont St. Quentin from the west. The offensive succeeded, with the Australian 5th Brigade (consisting of 1,340 men, supported by five brigades of field artillery, and four brigades of heavy artillery) securing Mont St. Quentin on the morning of 31 August, and capturing over 700 German prisoners. The 5th Brigade was then subjected to several counterattacks. Eventually, in the afternoon of the 31st one of these succeeded in recapturing the crest, although the Australians managed to hold on to a position just below the summit. The effort to take the Mont was later described by Rawlinson as "a magnificent performance...".

Mont St. Quentin was attacked a second time in the morning of 1 September, this time by the Australian 6th Brigade, with its right flank protected by the Australian 14th Brigade (5th Division) capturing part of Péronne. Attacking against troops of the German 38th Division), the 6th Brigade succeeded in capturing Mont St. Quentin. The attack continued on 2 September, with the 7th Brigade attacking east from Mont St. Quentin, extending the Allied lines beyond the high ground while elements of the 5th Division took the remaining part of Péronne.

By 4 September, the 2nd Division was relieved by the 3rd Division for the pursuit beyond Peronne. It subsequently began a rest period that lasted until late September. On 23 September, the 19th, 21st and 25th Battalions were ordered to disband to make up the strength of the other battalions in their brigades, as the division moved towards the nine battalion structure used by the British. The decision proved unpopular with the troops, who wished to maintain their battalion identities, and the soldiers refused to obey the order to disband. As a result, the units remained in existence until October, after the Australians had fought their final battles of the war.

By early October, Allied forces had succeeded in capturing the main Hindenburg defences in the first part of the Battle of St. Quentin Canal, and the supporting defences; however, this left the third line of defences, the "Beaurevoir Line". Relieving the Australian 5th Division on 1 October, the 2nd Division's was to attack, along with the Australian 1st Division and the American 27th and 30th Divisions, and breach the Beaurevoir Line, opening a gap for the cavalry to exploit.

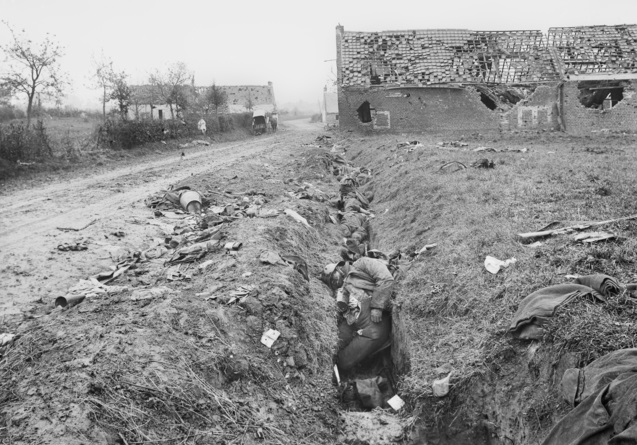
Aftermath of the fighting at Montbrehain, the final action of the war for the Australians

The 2nd Division attacked the Beaurevoir Line on 3 October, with two brigades (the 5th and 7th) totalling 2,500 men on an frontage of 6,000 yards (5,500 m). Starting out from Estrees, the objectives called for a 2-mile (3.2 km) advance. Attacking before sunrise, the soldiers managed to capture the fortified positions at the la Motte Farm and Mushroom Quarry (at a cost of 989 casualties), but were stopped short of their final objective: the village of Beaurevoir. Continuing the attack on 4 October, the 2nd Division approached the village of Beaurevoir, and conducted further attacks the next day to capture Montbrehain. After much hard fighting by two battalions of the 6th Brigade (reinforced by the 2nd Pioneer Battalion, which attacked as infantry) (against the German 241st (Saxon), 24th and the 34th Divisions), the village was captured, along with nearly 400 German prisoners. This drove a mile long salient into the German lines, and was described by Charles Bean as "one of the most brilliant actions of Australian infantry in the First World War". However, this action cost the Australians an additional 430 casualties.

The 2nd Division was relieved by the US 30th Division on the evening of 5 October, with the intention of allowing it to rest until the start of the campaigning season in 1919; however, as the Armistice was signed in November 1918, the 2nd Division was the last Australian division to see combat in World War I. With the end of the war, Australian forces were not involved in occupation duties, and were quickly disbanded, and the soldiers transported back to Australia. As a result, the 2nd Division merged with the Australian 5th Division in March 1919 (as a single division of four brigades). Throughout the war, the division lost over 12,000 killed in action or died of wounds or other causes, and nearly 38,000 wounded, while 13 members of the division received the Victoria Cross.

== Inter-war years and World War II ==
On 1 April 1921, the AIF was officially disbanded. After this, Australia's part-time military forces were re-organised to perpetuate the numerical designations of the AIF. As a result, the division was reformed as a Citizens Military Forces/Militia (reserve) formation, consisting of the 5th, 9th and 14th Brigades, each of four infantry battalions: 4th, 20th, 36th, and 54th (5th Brigade); 1st, 19th, 34th, and 45th (9th Brigade); and 3rd, 53rd, 55th and 56th (14th Brigade). Defence spending was limited during this time, and while initially it was planned to maintain a strong Reserve element through compulsory training, this scheme was only partially implemented in the 1920s, and was suspended following the Great Depression. Defence spending remained low throughout the 1930s, and voluntary recruitment proved inadequate. As a result, the inter-war years were characterised by limited equipment and reduced manning levels.

During World War II, the division was composed primarily of infantry units from New South Wales and its headquarters was based initially in Sydney, around Parramatta. When the war broke out in September 1939, the 2nd Division was commanded by Major General Iven Mackay.

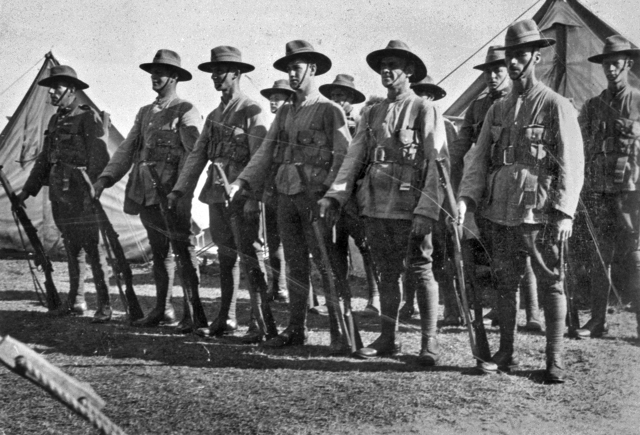
Soldiers of the CMF 56th Battalion, part of the 14th Brigade, in 1937

In 1940, the division's component brigades were reduced from four battalions to three, and units undertook short period of training to improve readiness as the division was partially mobilised. As the Militia was barred from overseas service, many members left the division to join the Second Australian Imperial Force. In July 1940, Major General James Cannan assumed command of the division until October when he handed over to Major General Herbert Lloyd. Following Japan's entry into the war, the Militia was called up for home defence. At this time, the division's main role was the defence of Sydney; however, after training around Bathurst, Walgrove and Greta, the division's brigades relieved those of the 1st Division in defence of Newcastle, so that those units could undertake collective training. This lasted until March 1942.

In May 1942, the 14th Brigade (3rd, 36th, and 55th Battalions) was transferred to New Guinea Force, where they joined the garrison around Port Moresby. Initially assigned to II Corps, in July, the 2nd Division was transferred to III Corps, for the defence of Western Australia, relieving the 4th Division around Guildford, Western Australia. The 5th Brigade (54th, 56th and 44th Battalions, the latter being a Western Australian unit) and 8th Brigade (4th, 30th and 35th Battalions) were joined by the 13th Brigade (the 11th, 16th, and 28th Battalions, all from Western Australia).

As the Allies assumed the offensive in the Pacific, the threat to Australia diminished, allowing for a reduction in garrison forces. Subsequently, the division prepared for active service in the Australian territory of New Guinea. In early 1943, the 13th Brigade was detached, and the 2nd Brigade became part of the division until August 1943, when it was sent to Darwin. Following this, the 8th Brigade was transferred to Sydney and then north Queensland, eventually joining the 5th Division in September 1943, for service in New Guinea. The 3rd Motor Brigade joined the division. In early 1944, the 5th Brigade was sent to Queensland and in May of that year the 2nd Division was disbanded. The division's final commander was Major General Horace Robertson who commanded the division from September 1943.

== Post-war ==
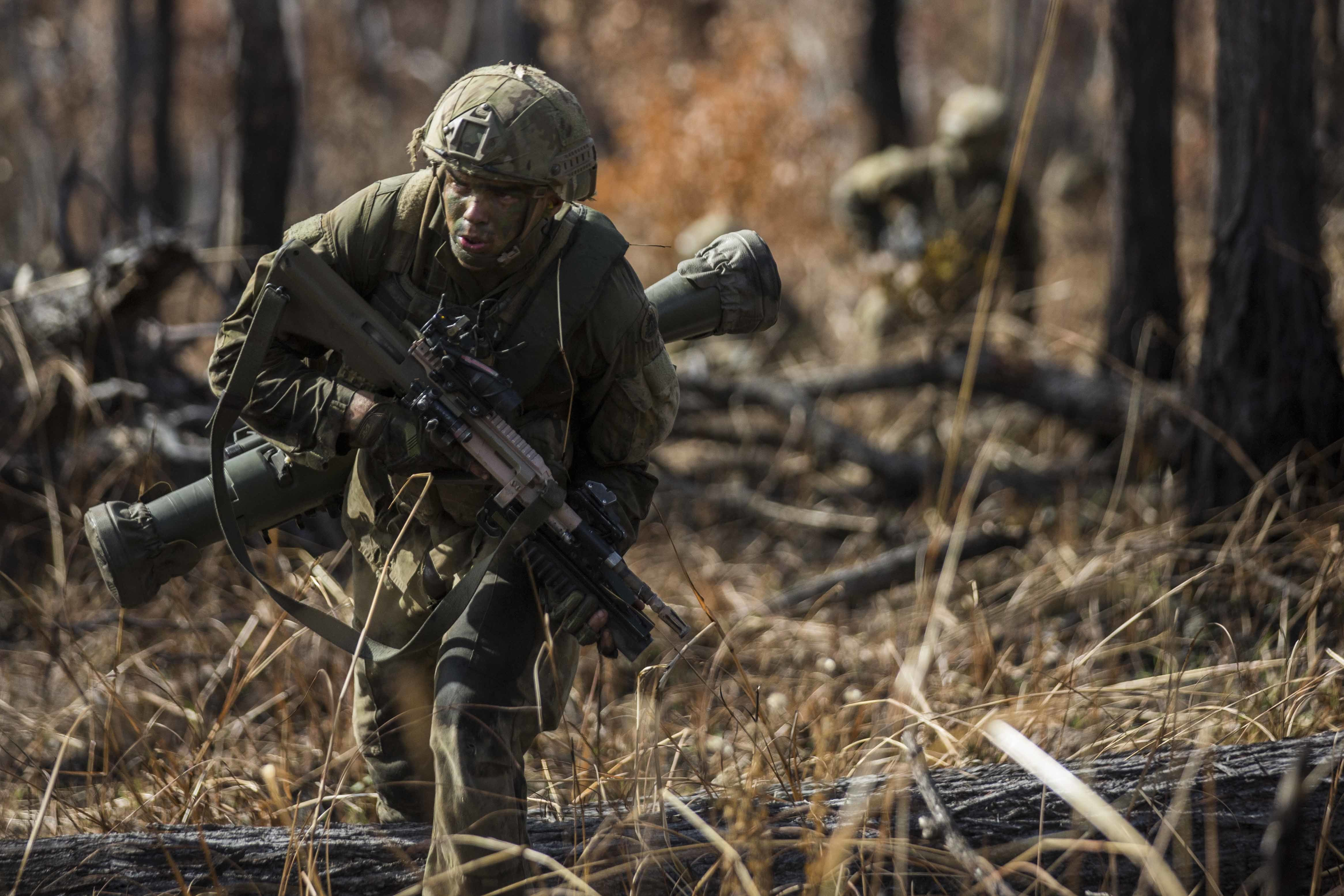
An 8th Brigade soldier during Exercise Southern Jackaroo in 2016

In 1948, the Citizen Military Forces were re-formed, firstly by voluntary enlistment but then by a mixture of voluntary and compulsory national service from 1951 to 1957, and then 1965 to 1972, when national service was abolished. The 2nd Division was formed again as the main CMF formation in New South Wales, initially consisting of the 5th, 7th and 8th Brigades, although in 1953 it was reorganised and consisted of the 5th, 8th and 14th Brigades. In 1960, the division was disbanded with the advent of the Pentropic organisation scheme that was based around the five element battle group. The division was revived in 1965 when the Pentropic organisation was abandoned. Upon being re-raised, the division consisted of two brigade-level formations: the 5th and 8th Task Forces; these reverted to brigade-designations in 1982. In the 1990s, following the disbandment of the 3rd Division, the 2nd Division became the main Army Reserve formation, assuming command of several other brigade-level elements.

The 7th Brigade transferred its Reserve personnel to the division (mainly to the 11th Brigade) in 2011 as that brigade became a completely Regular formation of Forces Command. In September 2014, the division received the three Regional Force Surveillance Units from the 6th Brigade, and as of late 2014, the division included over 11,000 Reservists. In January 2015, Major General Stephen Porter took over command of the division. Under the Army's Plan Beersheba reforms, the 4th and 9th Brigades were paired with the regular 1st Brigade; 5th and 8th Brigades with the regular 7th Brigade; and the 11th and 13th Brigades with the regular 3rd Brigade, tasked with providing a battle group to each Regular manoeuvre brigade during the ready phase of the force generation cycle: Battle Groups Cannan (11th and 13th Brigades), Jacka (4th and 9th Brigades) and Waratah (5th and 8th Brigades). On 24 July 2015, members of the 2nd Division marked 100 years of service with a national parade at the Australian War Memorial in Canberra. In 2017–2018, the 8th Brigade became responsible for the management of training delivered to Reserve soldiers within the 2nd Division.

During the period since 2011, the division has deployed forces and provided individual troops to deployments to the Solomon Islands, Timor Leste, Afghanistan, and South Sudan as well as supporting ongoing border protection operations. The division was renamed the 2nd (Australian) Division effective 1 July 2023. The 2nd Division is tasked with the command of all of the largely part-time security brigades in Australia.

== Memorial ==
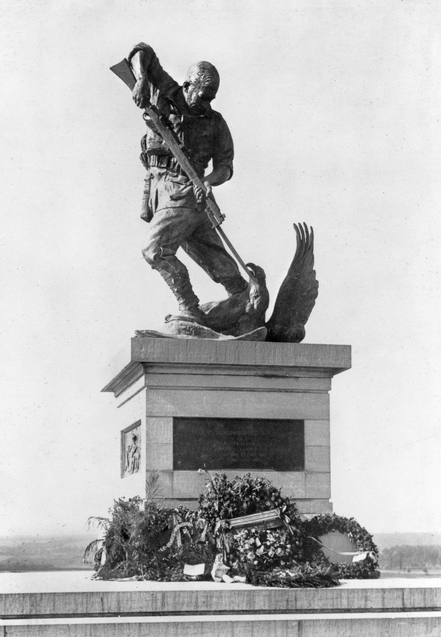
The original 2nd Division memorial

Positioned at Mont St Quentin (49°56′51.61″N 2°55′55.91″E), where the Australian 2nd Division captured one of the most formidable defensive positions on the Western Front, the 2nd Division's memorial was unconventional. Instead of an obelisk such as at the other four AIF divisional memorials, the original memorial which was unveiled in 1925 was a statue of an Australian soldier bayoneting a German eagle sprawled at his feet. However, this statue was removed and destroyed by German soldiers in 1940 during World War II, leaving only the stone plinth. A replacement statue, consisting of an Australian soldier standing in full kit was installed in 1971.

The memorial lists the battle honours of the 2nd Division as: Pozieres, Mouquet Farm, Flers, Malt Trench, Lagnicourt, Bullecourt, Menin Road, Broodseinde Ridge, Passchendaele, Ville-sur-Ancre, Morlancourt, Hamel, Villers-Bretonneux, Herleville, Herbécourt, Biaches, Mont St. Quentin, Beaurevoir Line, and Montbrehain.

== Organisation 2025 ==
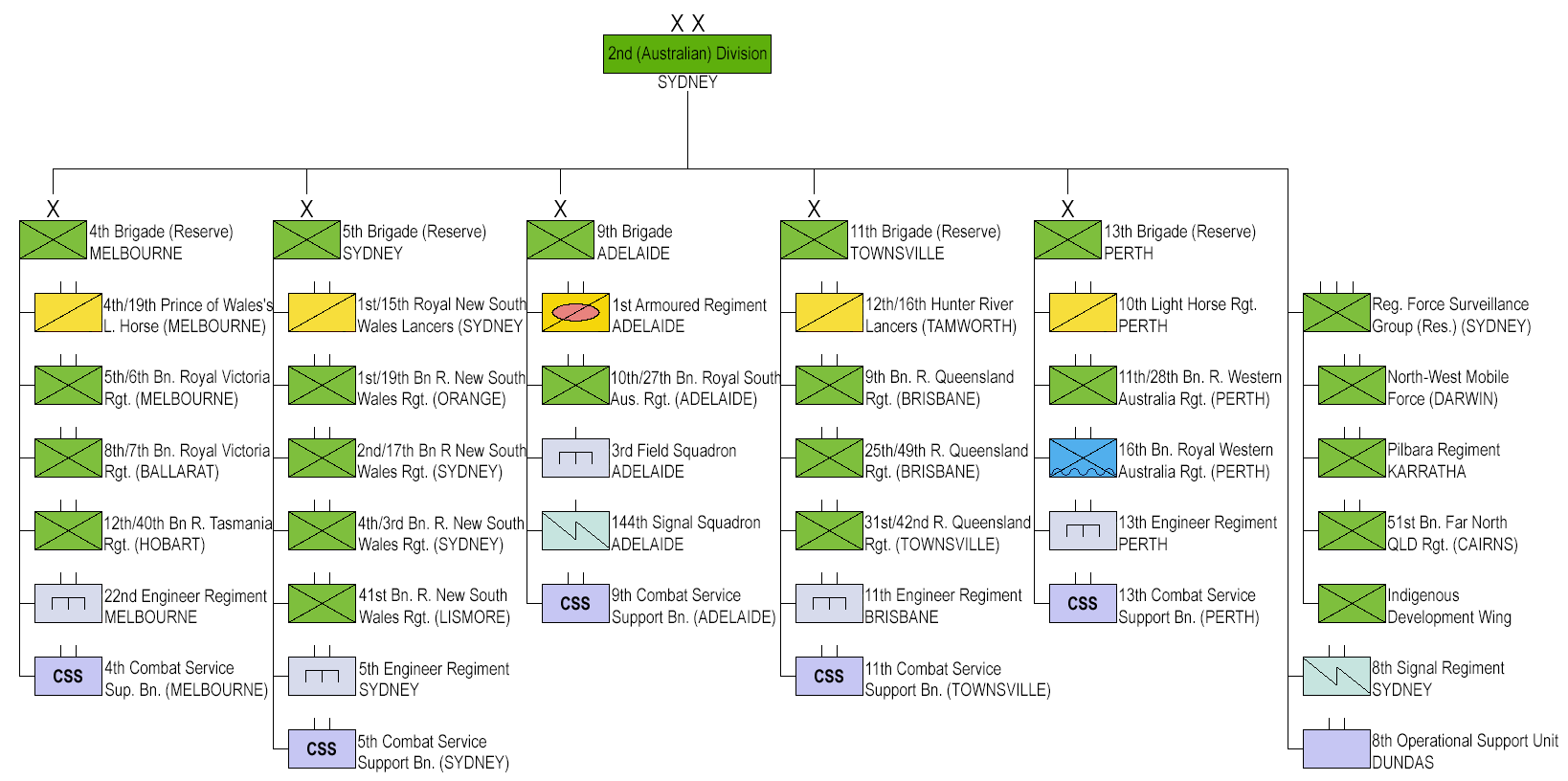
2nd (Australian) Division organization 2026

As of 2025 the division commands most Australian Army reserve units:

- 4th Brigade, Victoria and Tasmania.
- 5th Brigade, New South Wales
- 9th Brigade, South Australia
- 11th Brigade, Queensland
- 13th Brigade, Western Australia
- Regional Force Surveillance Group, HQ in Darwin and units in Northern Australia
- 8th Signals Regiment, all states
- 8th Operational Support Unit

== Commanding Generals ==
Commanders of 2 (AS) DIV
Date from	Date to	Commander
26-July-1915	27-December-1916	MAJGEN J.G. Legge, CMG
28-December-1916	01-May-1918	MAJGEN N.M. Smyth, VC, CB
22-May-1918	09-March-1919	MAJGEN C. Rosenthal, CB, CMG
01-May-1921	30-April-1926	MAJGEN Sir Charles Rosenthal, KCB, CMG, DSO
01-May-1926	17-November-1926	BRIG J. Paton, CB, CMG, VD
18-November-1926	31-December-1931	BRIG H.G. Bennett, CB, CMG, DSO, VD
18-January-1932	23-March-1937	MAJGEN Sir Charles Rosenthal, KCB, CMG, DSO, VD
24-March-1937	04-April-1940	MAJGEN I.G. Mackay, CMG, DSO, VD
08-July-1940	24-October-1940	MAJGEN J.H. Cannan, CB, CMG, DSO, VD
24-October-1940	10-September-1943	MAJGEN H.W. Lloyd, CB, CMG, CVO, DSO
11-September-1943	09-February-1944	MAJGEN H.C.H. Robertson, CBE, DSO
10-November-1947	30-June-1950	MAJGEN J.E.S. Stevens, CB, DSO, ED
01-July-1950	01-July-1952	MAJGEN W.J.V. Windeyer, CBE, DSO, ED
01-July-1952	15-August-1954	MAJGEN I.N. Dougherty, CBE, DSO, ED
16-August-1954	30-November-1957	MAJGEN D. Macarthur-Onslow, CBE, DSO, ED
01-December-1957	30-November-1959	MAJGEN J.R. Stevenson, CBE, DSO, ED
01-December-1959	30-November-1960	MAJGEN J.A. Bishop, DSO, OBE, ED
17-August-1965	30-November-1966	MAJGEN J.R. Broadbent, DSO, ED
01-December-1966	30-November-1968	MAJGEN A.C. Murchison, MC, ED
01-December-1968	21-October-1970	MAJGEN S.L.M. Eskell, ED
22-October-1970	31-March-1973	MAJGEN E.S. Marshall, OBE, ED
01-April-1973	27-October-1974	MAJGEN J.M.L. Macdonald, MBE, ED
28-October-1974	30-June-1978	MAJGEN G.L. Maitland, OBE, ED
01-July-1978	31-March-1982	MAJGEN K.R. Murray, AO, OBE, ED, QC
01-April-1982	31-December-1984	MAJGEN R.J. Sharp, AO, RFD, ED
01-January-1985	31-March-1988	MAJGEN R.G. Fay, RFD, ED
01-April-1988	31-March-1991	MAJGEN J.D. Keldie, AO, MC
01-April-1991	01-November-1994	MAJGEN W.E. Glenny, AO, RFD, ED
02-November-1994	07-November-1997	MAJGEN B.A. McGrath, RFD
08-November-1997	31-December-2000	MAJGEN C.R.R. Hoeben, AM, RFD
01-January-2001	31-December-2002	MAJGEN N.M. Wilson, AM, RFD
01-January-2003	31-December-2005	MAJGEN R.P. Irving, AM, RFD
01-January-2006	31-December-2008	MAJGEN I.B. Flawith, AO, CSC
01-January-2009	31-December-2011	MAJGEN C.D. Williams, AM
01-January-2012	31-December-2014	MAJGEN S.L. Smith, AM, CSC, RFD
01-January-2015	31-December-2018	MAJGEN S.H. Porter, AO
01-January-2019	17-July-2021	MAJGEN K.J Campbell, AO, CSC
17-July-2021	07-December-2024	MAJGEN D.J. Thomae, AM
07-December-2024		MAJGEN M.I. Burr, AM

== See also ==
- 1916 Pioneer Exhibition Game
