= Jim Barry (general) =

Australian general and businessman

- Born: 7 September 1932 (age 94); Melbourne, Victoria
- Military career
- Allegiance: Australia
- Branch: Australian Army Reserve
- Service years: 1951–1987
- Rank: Major General
- Commands: 3rd Division (1985–87)
- Conflicts: Vietnam War
- Awards: Member of the Order of Australia; Member of the Order of the British Empire; Reserve Force Decoration; Efficiency Decoration

Major General James Edward Barry, AM, MBE, RFD, ED (born 7 September 1932) is an Australian businessman, Army Reserve officer, and sports administrator. His appointments have included commander 3rd Division, Executive Member of the Australian Olympic Committee and President of the Australian Gymnastic Federation.

== Public service ==
=== Sport ===
Having an early association with sport as a gymnast, Barry served as President of the Australian Gymnastic Federation for 25 years, and as an Executive Member and Vice-President of the International Federation of Gymnastics (FIG) for 12 years.

He was an Executive Member of the Australian Olympic Committee from 1993 to 2005, and officiated at ten Olympic Games and six Commonwealth Games. He held headquarters positions on the Olympic Teams at the 1972 Munich and 1976 Montreal games, was Assistant General Manager at the 1980 Moscow games, and was also General Manager of the 1982 Commonwealth Games Team to Brisbane.

=== Army Reserve ===
Barry enlisted in the Citizen Military Forces in 1951, and rose through the ranks in various artillery and headquarters positions to major general and appointment as Commander 3rd Division in 1985. On relinquishing command in 1987, he was appointed Honorary Colonel of Melbourne University Regiment, a position he held for six years. He was also appointed Colonel Commandant of Artillery – Victoria from 1992 to 1996.

He was the National President of the Defence Reserves Association (DRA) between 2005 and 2013 and subsequently an Executive member as Past President. He is also Vice President-Reserves on the Defence Force Welfare Association (DFWA). He is also a Foundation Member of the General Sir John Monash Foundation, a committee member of the Field Marshal Sir Thomas Blamey Memorial Fund and Deputy Chairman of the Spirit of Australia Foundation.

=== Others ===
Barry was a founding member of the Spirit of Australia Foundation and has served as its Deputy Chairman. He has also served as Chairman of Professional Association Management Services. In 2011 Jim Barry became a founding Patron of Military History & Heritage Victoria inc.

== Personal ==
Jim Barry was educated at the University of Melbourne, graduating as a Bachelor of Commerce. After 10 years in the printing and publishing industry, he established his own business in the Graphic Arts industry in the 1960s, before retiring in 1992.

== Honours and awards ==
- 1978: Appointed Member of the Order of the British Empire (Civil)
- 1987: Appointed Honorary Colonel of Melbourne University Regiment
- 1998: Appointed Member of the Order of Australia (AM)
- 2000: Awarded the Australian Sports Medal

Military offices
Preceded by Major General Kevin Cooke	Commander 3rd Division; 1985–1987	Succeeded by Major General Barry Nunn
