= 3rd Division (Australia) =

1916-1991 Australian Army division

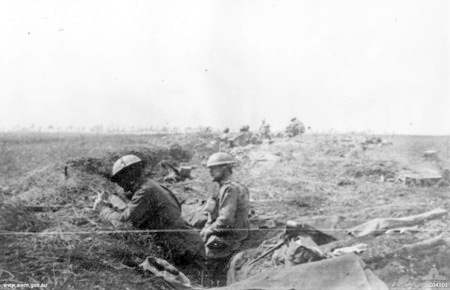
- 3rd Division troops around Lena Wood, 8 August 1918
- Active: 1916–1919; 1921–1946; 1948–1991
- Country: Australia
- Branch: Australian Army
- Type: Infantry
- Size: ~13,000 to 18,000 personnel
- Part of: II ANZAC Corps (1916–1917); Australian Corps (1917–1919); I Corps (1942–1944); II Corps (1944–1945)
- Engagements: World War I: Western Front; World War II: New Guinea campaign; Salamaua–Lae campaign; Bougainville campaign.

Commanders
- Notable commanders: John Monash; John Gellibrand; Harold Elliott; Thomas Blamey; Stanley Savige; William Bridgeford; George Wootten

Insignia
- Unit colour patch

The 3rd Division was an infantry division of the Australian Army. Existing during various periods between 1916 and 1991, it is considered the "longest serving Australian Army division". It was first formed during World War I, as an infantry division of the Australian Imperial Force and saw service on the Western Front in France and Belgium. During this time it fought major battles at Messines, Broodseinde Ridge, Passchendaele, Amiens, and the St Quentin Canal.

The division was demobilised in 1919 before being re-raised in 1921 as part of the Citizen Forces, based in central Victoria. Throughout the 1920s and 1930s, the division's establishment fluctuated due to the effects of the Great Depression and a general apathy towards military matters.

During World War II, the division was mobilised for war in December 1941 and initially undertook defensive duties in Australia before being deployed to New Guinea in 1943 where they took part in the Salamaua–Lae campaign against the Japanese in 1943–1944, before returning to Australia for rest and reorganisation. In late 1944 they were sent to Bougainville to take part in the Bougainville campaign the final campaign of the war. There they undertook a series of advances across the island before the war came to an end in August 1945.

Following the end of hostilities the division was disbanded in December 1945 as part of the demobilisation process, but was it later re-raised in 1948 as part of the Citizens Military Force. It subsequently served through the Cold War as a reserve formation until 1991 when the division was disbanded for a final time as the Australian Army was restructured and the focus of Australian field force operations shifted from the divisions to brigades.

== History ==
=== World War I ===
==== Formation and training ====
In early 1916, following the unsuccessful Gallipoli campaign, the decision was made to expand the size of the Australian Imperial Force (AIF). At the time there were two divisions in Egypt—the 1st and 2nd—and of these, one of them (the 1st) was split up to provide a cadre upon which to raise the 4th and 5th Divisions. Around this time the decision to raise a fifth division from fresh volunteers in Australia was also made and as a result the 3rd Division was officially raised on 2 February 1916.

Upon formation, the division drew its personnel from all Australian states and consisted of three four-battalion infantry brigades—the 9th, 10th and the 11th—and a number of supporting elements including engineers, artillery and medical personnel. Only rudimentary initial training was undertaken before elements of the division began the embarkation process in May and June 1916 as they were moved to the United Kingdom, where the individual sub units concentrated for the first time, received arms and other equipment and began the task of undertaking further training at Larkhill, in the Salisbury Plain Training Area. In July the division's artillery component was formed, consisting of three batteries of 18-pounders and one 4.5 inch howitzer battery. The process of raising and training took some time and consequently the division was not transferred to France until mid November 1916. Prior to this, however, the division endured proposals to break it up to provide reinforcements to the other four Australian divisions that were already in France. Although these threats passed, in early September 1916, following losses around Pozières, almost 3,000 men from the 3rd Division were transferred. Throughout October it seemed likely that further drafts would be siphoned away from the division, however, this did not occur and in early November two divisional exercises were undertaken. Finally, on 21 November 1916, the 3rd Division crossed the English Channel and arrived in France.

Under the command of Major General John Monash, the division was assigned to II ANZAC Corps. For the next two years they would take part in most of the major battles that the Australians fought on the Western Front. Initially they were deployed around Armentières in a "quiet" sector of the line, where they gained their first experiences of trench warfare, conducting patrols into No Man's Land and minor raids on the German trenches opposite them during the winter months.

==== Early engagements, 1917 ====
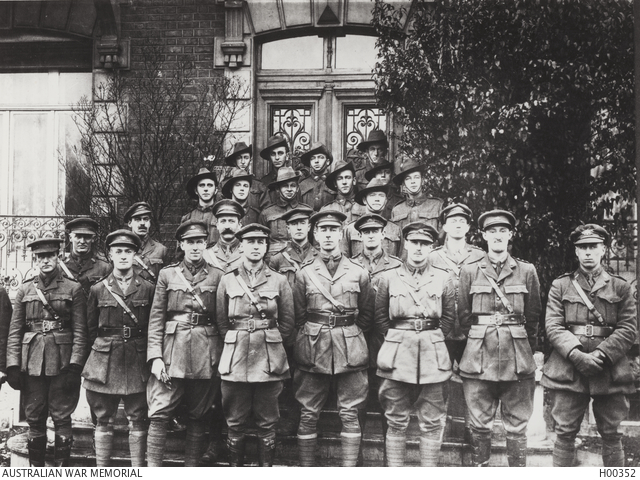
Group portrait of Lieutenant Colonel Muir Purser and headquarters staff of the 29th Australian Infantry Battalion, May 1917.

By January 1917 the 3rd Division's artillery had been reorganised so that it consisted of two field artillery brigades, each of which consisted of three six-gun 18-pounder batteries and twelve 4.5 inch howitzers. These brigades were the 7th (consisting of the 25th, 26th, 27th and 107th Batteries) and the 8th (29th, 30th, 31st and 108th Batteries). In April 1917 the division was moved to the Messines–Wytschaete Ridge section of the line in Belgium, taking up a position on the extreme right of II ANZAC Corps, with the New Zealand Division to its left. It was here, in early June 1917, that the division undertook its first major engagement of the war when it was committed to the fighting during the Battle of Messines. Monash tasked the 9th and 10th Brigades to provide the assault force for the 3rd Division's part of the operation, while the 11th Brigade was to act as the divisional reserve.

As the division's assault units began their approach march towards the Line of Departure late on the evening of 6 June, the German artillery opened up with a gas bombardment that severely hindered the march, breaking up the assaulting units as men became lost. Suffering over 2,000 casualties before the battle even began, many of the division's assault units reached their assembly points with less than 200 men, nevertheless they arrived on time and at the appointed hour, after a number of mines were exploded in front of their positions, the assault began. The exploding mines had destroyed a large part of the German line and as a result initial resistance was quickly overcome by the division's lead battalions—the 33rd, 34th, 38th and 39th—and by 5 am, the division had gained the crest of the Messines ridge and began digging in to defend against a possible counter-attack. In the engagements that followed the division largely played only a supporting role.

Following this, the division's next major engagement came on 4 October 1917 when it took part in the Battle of Broodseinde Ridge. This time the 9th Brigade was held back in reserve, while the 10th and 11th Brigades led the division forward. Attacking on the left of the Australian 2nd Division and the right of the New Zealand Division, early on the morning of the scheduled start of the attack the German artillery opened up on the division's eight assaulting infantry battalions as they stood to in the open ready to step off. Conserving their artillery for the main attack, the supporting Allied artillery only provided limited counter-battery fire and the division suffered heavily as they were forced to endure an hour-long barrage before zero hour came at 6 am. As the 37th and 43rd Battalions led the advance towards the German lines, supported by small teams of mortarmen and machine gunners, the Germans launched their own attack, however, the Australian assault had taken them by surprise and after some initial resistance, the German assault troops began to fall back or surrender. As the follow-on battalions exploited the ground gained in the initial assault the advance continued and by 9:15 am the 3rd Division had carried the ridge and begun to dig in, having advanced 2,000 yards (1,800 m). A counterattack late in the day on the 11th Brigade's position was turned back, sealing a stunning success for the 3rd Division. Nevertheless, the division's casualties were high, with over 1,800 men killed or wounded. For his actions during the attack, Walter Peeler, a Lewis-gunner from the 3rd Pioneer Battalion who was attached to 37th Battalion for anti-aircraft duties received the Victoria Cross after he personally led the assault on a number of German positions.

They held the line for a further three days before being withdrawn for rest and reorganisation. On 10 October 1917 the division returned to the front and began to make preparations to assault Passchendaele Ridge, an advance of over 3,000 yards (2,700 m). Heavy rain, however, had turned the battlefield into a thick, muddy morass and as a result transportation and resupply efforts were hampered as were attempts to reposition the supporting artillery and as a consequence when the attack went in at 5:25 am on 12 October the 9th and 10th Brigades had only limited fire support. With only a fraction of the guns required and limited ammunition, the artillery that was supposed to provide a creeping barrage behind which the infantry were to advance could only provide a thin bombardment. Nevertheless, the mud was so thick that the infantry were unable to keep up with the barrage and, unable to maintain the required rate of advance, they eventually they fell behind the barrage and lost any cover that it might otherwise have provided.

Upon reaching the Bellevue Spur, the assaulting infantry, caught in the open upon the barbed wire in front of the German positions, suffered heavily at the hands of the German artillery that was able to fire without answer from the British batteries that had run out of ammunition. Nevertheless, the 10th Brigade managed to reach its first objective, as did the 9th which even pushed on to its second, however, as they began to receive enfilade fire from their left flank where the New Zealand Division's attack had ground to a halt, the Germans began massing for a counterattack and the Australian positions quickly became untenable. On the division's right flank another gap had begun to develop as they lost contact with the Australian 4th Division and as a result the order to retire was passed. As they returned to the start line, the assault units were relieved by the 11th Brigade, which had formed the divisional reserve. By the end of the day, the division had lost almost 3,200 men killed or wounded. They played no further offensive role in the battle and were eventually removed from the line on 22 October as the Canadians took over from them.

The fighting around Passchendaele proved to be the division's last offensive actions for 1917 and they spent the winter months in the rear training, or undertaking defensive duties in reasonably quiet sectors of the line as they were reformed and brought back up to strength. Around this time also, the five Australian divisions on the Western Front were reorganised into a unified command structure under the Australian Corps.

==== German Spring Offensive, 1918 ====
In March 1918 the Germans launched their Spring Offensive near Saint-Quentin and as the Allied line collapsed, the German forces advanced swiftly into the Somme valley. Believing that another attack would be directed against the forces in the Flanders sector, in an effort to reinforce the British forces there, the Allied commanders recalled the 3rd Division was recalled from its quiet sector around Armentières and sent it to Ypres. The attack came, however, at the Somme and so on 24 March the division was transferred south to help stem the advance and defend the approaches towards the important railhead at Amiens. Temporarily placed under the command of the British VII Corps, the division took up position to the east of Amiens in between the Ancre and Somme Rivers.

Lacking any reserves and possessing only limited artillery support, the division's engineers prepared the bridges over the rivers for detonation. From 27 March onwards minor actions were fought along the line as the German advance began to reach the Australians. On 30 March, during the First Battle of Morlancourt, a serious attempt at penetrating the line around Sailly-Laurette was held and broken up by the 11th Brigade, with German losses being assessed at around one and a half brigades, or roughly between 3,000 and 4,000 men. Meanwhile, the 9th Brigade was detached from the division and sent south, where it participated in a counter-attack around Villers-Bretonneux. On 6 April, further attempts were made and in the confusion the charges that had been placed on the Bouzencourt Bridge were fired and it was dropped into the Somme Canal. Nevertheless, the attempt was beaten off by the 10th Brigade. Following this the Australians were able to begin taking the initiative and throughout May they began to slowly recapture some of the ground that had been lost earlier as they undertook a series of Peaceful Penetration operations, including the Second Battle of Morlancourt.

In June 1918, the 3rd Division's commander, Monash, was promoted to take over command of the Australian Corps and as a result Major General John Gellibrand took over as divisional commander.

==== Battle of Amiens, 1918 ====
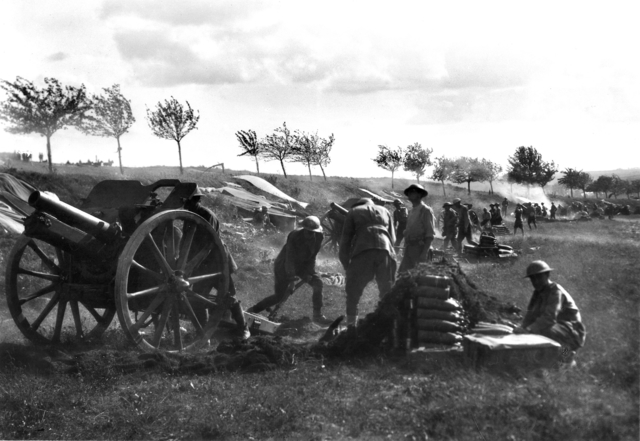
The 108th Howitzer Battery in action around Bray, August 1918

On 8 August 1918, the Allies launched their Hundred Days Offensive around Amiens and the 3rd Division was tasked with leading the Australian Corps part in the attack. By this stage, the divisional artillery consisted of three field brigades, and under the cover of a heavy artillery bombardment provided by nine field brigades that were organised in three supporting sub-groups, and supported by tanks and gas, the attack began at 4:20 am. The weight of the Allied fire support was intense as over 2,000 artillery pieces opened up on the German defences. The assaulting infantry battalions were each assigned a frontage of about 1,000 yards (910 m) which they assaulted with two companies forward and two in support. Thick smoke meant that the attackers found it difficult to maintain their spacing and some of the supporting armour was also delayed. Nevertheless, the attack proved successful, as the Australians overwhelmed the German defenders and by the end of the day the division had achieved all of its objectives.

Throughout the rest of August, they continued offensive operations, even launching daylight raids upon the German positions. On 22 August they attacked once more, advancing through the village of Bray, capturing a number of German prisoners. After a brief lull in the fighting, they continued the advance again on 25 August capturing Clery at the end of the week before taking Allaines on 2 September. Throughout September the Germans began to withdraw back towards the Hindenburg Line and the 3rd Division took part in the operations undertaken to follow them up and harass the rearguard. Casualties during this phase had been high, however, and as a result the division's pioneers were used as infantry and even led the advance towards Buire on 6 September.

As operations continued throughout the month, casualties amongst the Australian Corps became critical and the decision was made to disband some of the 3rd Division's battalions and use them to reinforce the remaining units. This decision saw the reduction of the strength of division's infantry brigades from four battalions to three, bringing the Australians into line with the British, who had made a similar decision earlier in the war. Nevertheless, the decision was not popular amongst the soldiers and when the 42nd Battalion received the order to disband, the attempt was rejected by its personnel and the order disobeyed. As a result, the proposed reorganisation was postponed until after the division's final offensive actions were fought in early October 1918. These came around the St Quentin Canal when the division attacked the Beaurevoir Line in concert with American troops from the US 27th Division, who would lead the assault in. The attack went awry, however, when the lead assault units failed to adequately clear the forward positions and subsequently when the 3rd Division was committed they came under fire almost immediately and instead of passing through the American positions, they had to complete the mopping up process before they could advance. Nevertheless, by nightfall on 1 October, the division had captured the northern end of the tunnel that ran under the canal.

On 2 October the majority of the 3rd Division was removed from the line for rest and reorganisation, although a number of its artillery batteries would continue to support the operations of the II American Corps until they were withdrawn. Following this they continued to participate in the fighting in support of the British 6th Division. The 27th Battery fired the division's last shot of the war on 4 November at Wassigny. Nevertheless, the division was out of the line when news of the Armistice came on 11 November 1918. Following the end of hostilities the demobilisation process began and as men were repatriated back to Australia, the division was eventually disbanded on 28 May 1919.

=== Inter-war years ===
Following the end of the war, the AIF was disbanded and the focus of Australia's military forces was the units of the Citizens Force. Between 1918 and 1921, as the demobilisation process was completed, this force existed in a state of flux, however, in 1921 planning for the post war Army was finally completed. On 1 May 1921 the 3rd Division was re-raised in Victoria as part of the 3rd Military District. Upon formation it consisted of three four-battalion brigades—the 4th Brigade, 10th Brigade and 15th Brigade—and various supporting units including artillery, engineers, signals, transport and medical.

At this time, the existing infantry battalions of the Citizens Force were redesignated to perpetuate the numerical designations of the AIF, and although an attempt was made to allocate these designations based on regional considerations, ultimately this was not always possible and ultimately when the 3rd Division was re-established, only two of its component battalions—the 37th and 39th Battalions—had previously been assigned to the division.

With a peacetime establishment of about 16,000 personnel (18,400 upon mobilisation), the division was brought up to strength through the compulsory training scheme. Initially the system worked well and a number of the division's subunits reported being above establishment, however, this did not last long. In 1922, the Washington Naval Treaty was signed and theoretically alleviated Australia's security concerns about Japanese expansion in the Pacific. As a result, the Army's budget was halved and as the scope of the compulsory training scheme was scaled back, the authorised strength of each infantry battalion was reduced to just 409 men of all ranks. The division's artillery was also reduced, with one field battery in each artillery brigade being disbanded at this time. As a result of the subsequent reorganisation, the 3rd Division's artillery consisted of three artillery brigades, the 2nd, 4th and 8th.

In 1929 the compulsory training scheme was suspended following the election of the Scullin Labor government. In its place a new system was introduced whereby the Citizens Force would be maintained on a part-time, voluntary basis only. It was also renamed the "Militia" at this time. The decision to suspend compulsory training, coupled with the economic downturn of the Great Depression meant that the manpower of many Militia units dropped considerably and as a result a number of units were amalgamated. As a part of this process, the division was reduced from 12 infantry battalions to nine as six battalions were merged to form new amalgamated units—29th/22nd, 37th/52nd and 57th/60th Battalions. To a large extent, however, these were hollow structures and by 1931 the 3rd Division's overall establishment was just 4,505 men all ranks.

Throughout the 1930s the number of active personnel remained low and out of necessity training opportunities were limited. After 1936, however, the Army attempted to improve the conditions of service for its members and to reinvigorate the training program, while individual units began to undertake their own recruiting campaigns. Nevertheless, it was not until 1938, as tensions grew in Europe and the prospect of war became more likely, that an attempt was made to expand the establishment of the Militia. At this time an effort was made to determine the readiness of the Militia to expand if mobilised. During the continuous training camps undertaken throughout 1938, each component unit was assessed with mixed results. The following year, 1939, saw further expansion and by the end of April of that year, the division's posted strength had grown to 9,589 personnel. As a part of this expansion, the divisional artillery was expanded by the re-raising of the batteries that had been disbanded in 1922.

=== World War II ===
==== Home duties ====
On 3 September 1939, Australia found itself once again at war, after attempts at finding a diplomatic solution to the German invasion of Poland had failed. Following the outbreak of World War II, mobilisation began slowly as the government called up a force of about 8,000 Militia personnel to undertake security duties in the days following the declaration of war. A short time later, the decision was made to raise an all volunteer force for overseas service, known as the Second Australian Imperial Force (2nd AIF). This was necessary due to the provisions of the Defence Act (1903) which precluded deploying the Militia outside of Australian territory, and as a result the government decided to use the Militia to provide a small cadre upon which the 2nd AIF would be raised, as well as to provide training to conscripts as part of the compulsory training scheme which was re-established in early 1940. Nevertheless, during this time large numbers of officers and senior non-commissioned officers from the 3rd Division volunteered for service with the 2nd AIF and many units lost a large number of their experienced personnel at this time.

Throughout 1940–41, the Militia were called up in cohorts for periods of continuous training, and the 3rd Division, still consisting of the 4th, 10th and 15th Brigades, undertook a series of training camps around Seymour, Victoria. In March 1941, the division's artillery was reorganised to bring it in line with the British organisational system with each artillery brigade being converted to a field regiment. Numerical designations stayed the same, however, and by late 1941 the division had completed its transition. This saw its infantry brigades once again reduced from four battalions to three, while various supporting elements were inserted at brigade-level, however, training at this time was still rudimentary and limited mainly to individual skills, and the division's establishment was recorded as being only half of its authorised wartime establishment. There was also a shortage of modern equipment.

With Japan's entry into the war following the attacks on Pearl Harbor and Malaya, it became more likely that the division would be called upon to undertake active service overseas, and the division was mobilised for war. In early January 1942, Major General Stanley Savige, an experienced officer who had commanded the 17th Brigade in combat against the Germans in the Middle East earlier in the war, took over command of the division. Savige set about the task of preparing the division for combat and he began by removing officers that he did not think were physically fit enough or competent to lead in battle and replacing them with men who had gained experience in AIF units. A comprehensive training program was established and in April 1942 the division was assigned to the Australian I Corps, and to enable divisional exercises to begin, the 3rd Division moved to Bonegilla, Victoria. To toughen the men up, Savige decided that they would march on foot to the new camp.

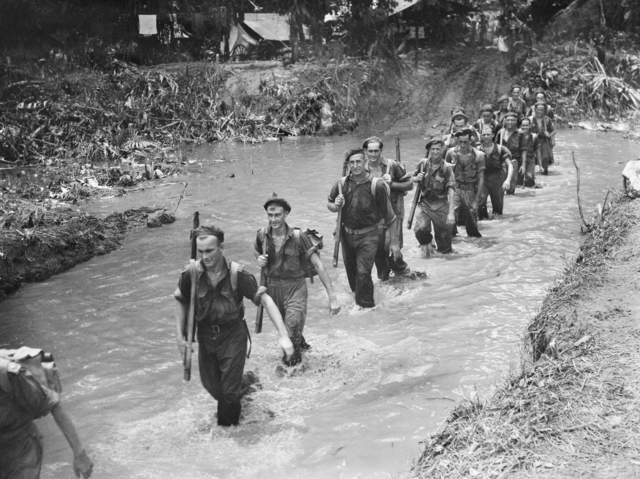
Men from the 61st Battalion patrol along the Mosigetta River on Bougainville in March 1945

The following month they were relocated once more, this time to Queensland where they undertook training exercises and defensive duties along the coast between Brisbane and Tweed Heads on the New South Wales border. At this time, the Army began to rectify the deficiencies in the division's equipment lists and battalions began receiving new machine guns, motor transport and Bren carriers. As the situation in New Guinea grew worse, the decision was made to reorganise the 3rd Division and throughout August, four battalions were amalgamated—the 37th, 52nd, 58th and 59th. In September, the 10th Brigade was disbanded and its battalions reallocated to the 4th and 15th Brigades. In October, the 29th and 46th Battalions were also amalgamated, leaving the division with just six infantry battalions in two brigades.

==== New Guinea, 1943–1944 ====
In early 1943 the division was despatched to New Guinea, with the 15th Brigade being sent to Port Moresby and the 4th Brigade going to Milne Bay. At this point the 4th Brigade was reassigned to the 5th Division. It would later be replaced within the division by the 29th Brigade. The division's stay in Port Moresby was brief and in April it began moving to Wau where they subsumed the units assigned to Kanga Force, including the 17th Brigade, a 2nd AIF formation, and began operations as part of the Salamaua–Lae campaign.

Initially operations were limited to the area immediately surrounding Bulolo, but as the division became established the headquarters was shifted to Tambu Bay and brigades were pushed out towards Mubo, and the Komiatum and Bobdui Ridges, while defensive patrols were undertaken through the Wampit Valley, around the Bulwa and Zenag airstrips and towards the Markham River. Stretched across a front of over 75 miles (121 km), in June the division was reinforced by the US 162nd Infantry Regiment. Following this the division took on primary responsibility for Allied operations in New Guinea. Eventually Lae fell in September and soon afterwards, its elements were moved back to Port Moresby, before being sent to support the 7th Division's campaign in the Markham and Ramu Valleys and the advance on Madang.

In August 1944 the 3rd Division's brigades were withdrawn back to Australia for leave and reorganisation. After this, preparations began for the division's next campaign. Around this time, the 3rd Division adopted the Jungle divisional establishment, and was reorganised around three infantry brigades: the 7th, 15th and 29th Brigades. It was also assigned to the Australian II Corps.

==== Bougainville 1944–1945 ====
In late 1944 it was decided that the Australians would take over responsibility from the Americans for operations against the Japanese on Bougainville. From November–December 1944, the 3rd Division, along with two independent brigades, the 11th and 23rd, began to relieve the units of the US XIV Corps that were to be transferred elsewhere in the Pacific. Allied intelligence of Japanese strengths on the island varied at the time, although it was believed that there were around 17,500 Japanese on Bougainville. Although this was later proved to be grossly incorrect, nevertheless the Allies believed that the Japanese formations in the area, despite being under strength, were still capable of carrying out effective combat operations. As a result, it was decided that II Corps would go on the offensive to clear the Japanese from the island and a three pronged campaign was planned in the northern, central and southern sectors of the island.

The division was supported by a number of artillery units including the 2nd and 4th Field Regiments and the 2nd Mountain Battery, and various anti-aircraft units. Later, also 'U' Heavy Battery, with four 155 mm howitzers was transferred from Lae, as was the 2/11th Field Regiment. To provide organic fire support during the advance, the decision was made at this time to place the divisional artillery assets directly underneath the subunits they were supporting. At the outset, the division's allocation of engineers consisted of only two field companies, the 5th and 11th, however over the course of the campaign others arrived including the 10th, 15th and the 7th, which was the last to arrive in June 1945. Ultimately the division had almost 1,600 engineers across five field companies and various supporting plant, park and other units. This represented one of the largest engineer contingents within an Australian division during the war. Initially the division was deployed without armoured support. However, in December 1944, 'B' Squadron, 2/4th Armoured Regiment, equipped with Matilda II tanks, arrived and subsequently took part in operations on the island attached to elements of the division.

The 7th Brigade, supported by the 2nd Field Regiment, was the first to commence operations, as the 9th Battalion launched a surprise attack in the central sector of the island upon a Japanese outpost at Little George Hill on 25 November. The following month the battalion seized control of Artillery Hill, while the 29th Brigade began patrolling operations in the southern sector.

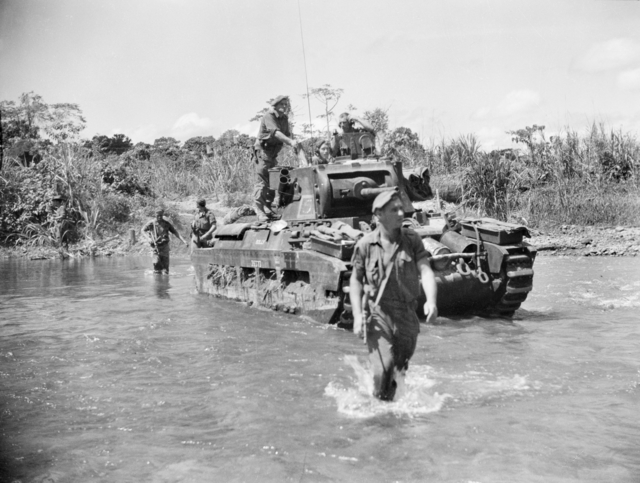
Troops from the 3rd Division cross the Hongorai River alongside Matilda tanks from the 2/4th Armoured Regiment in May 1945

Following the capture of Pearl Ridge by the 25th Battalion, the focus of the 3rd Division's operations on Bougainville was shifted on the northern and southern sectors. The 11th Brigade, independent of the 3rd Division, assumed control of the drive to the north, while the 3rd Division concentrated on the drive south towards Buin, where the main Japanese force was concentrated. Rotating his brigades, the division's commander, Major General William Bridgeford, advanced south from Torokina towards the Puriata river. After crossing it, the Japanese launched a significant counterattack around Slater's Knoll, which was eventually beaten off in early April.

In April 1945 the 15th Brigade took over from the 7th Brigade and resumed the advance on the Hongorai and Mivo rivers. In early July, the 29th Brigade relieved the 15th and continued the advance and as they attempted to cross the Mivo, the Japanese launched a ferocious counter-attack upon the 15th Battalion which was turned back by desperate defence. Following this the advance came to a halt as torrential rain turned the axis of advance into "a sea of mud" and many of the bridges upon which the Australian supply system was dependent were washed away. As the situation became worse, briefly even patrolling operations had to be stopped. These patrols were resumed, however, in late July and into August, as isolated pockets of Japanese began to attack the 3rd Division's supply lines and support units. As preparations were made to resume the advance, the dropping of two atomic bombs on Hiroshima and Nagasaki and Japan's subsequent unconditional surrender brought the fighting on Bougainville to an end and a cease fire came into effect.

Following the end of hostilities, the demobilisation process began and eventually the 3rd Division was disbanded on 4 December 1945. During the division's campaign in Bougainville, one of its soldiers, Reg Rattey, earned the Victoria Cross for his actions during the fighting around Slater's Knoll. Some personnel from the division later served in the 67th Infantry Battalion, undertaking occupation duties as part of the British Commonwealth Occupation Force in Japan.

=== Cold War ===
In 1948, with demobilisation of Australia's wartime army complete, the decision was made to re-raise the part-time forces of the Militia, albeit with the new name of the Citizens Military Force (CMF), and on a reduced establishment of two infantry divisions, an armoured brigade and various corps-level support units. During this time the 3rd Division was re-raised and based around a nucleus of three infantry brigades—the 4th, 6th and 9th Brigades—it was once again based in central Victoria, although subunits were also based in South Australia and Tasmania. Once again the division's component units bore little resemblance to those that had fought with it during the two World Wars. Service in the post war CMF was initially on a voluntary basis and recruitment remained poor until 1951 when conscription was introduced once again in an effort to improve the readiness of the Australian military during the Korean War. The 3rd Division was not deployed during this time, however, and although national service was instituted, service in Korea was undertaken on a voluntary basis, and conscription was used only as a means to expand the CMF and provide a base upon which mobilisation could be achieved if it proved necessary.

Nevertheless, the resulting influx of manpower revitalised the CMF to the point that during the 1950s the division experienced a remarkable level of manning and resources that saw many units achieve full strength, with full equipment allocations. On 23 March 1958 a divisional parade was conducted at Puckapunyal, bringing together all of the division's Victorian-based units in a concentration of force not seen in the division since 1916. The following year the division conducted a live-fire exercise at Puckapunyal based upon the 4th Brigade and involving over 3,500 men, tanks, artillery, aircraft, and various supporting arms. Despite the success demonstrated by the exercise, it would be the last time that the division mounted something similar the national service scheme was modified to limit the size of each yearly intake of trainees and the size of the CMF was reduced by over 30,000 men in an effort to free up Regular personnel to raise the 1st Brigade. The 1957 reforms, however, did not achieve the efficiencies required to free up Regular personnel to meet the strategic requirements to maintain a regular field force that was ready to respond to the exigencies of the Cold War. As a result, in 1959 the decision was made to suspend national service as it was realised that further changes were required to expand the size of the Regular army. Further changes came with the introduction of the Pentropic divisional establishment into the Australian Army. This saw the reduction of the Army to just two divisions, the 1st and 3rd Divisions, and as a part of this the division was reorganised into five battalion-plus sized battle groups, and resulted in the removal of brigade-level formations and the disbandment and amalgamation of a number of smaller regionally based infantry battalions, into larger units that were part of State-based regiments.

With an authorised peacetime establishment of 13,621 personnel, the 3rd Division included formations in five different military command districts including Queensland, New South Wales and Western Australia as well as those in South Australia, Tasmania and Victoria. The main infantry components at this time were: 2nd Battalion, Royal Queensland Regiment (RQR); 1st Battalion, Royal Victoria Regiment (RVR); 2nd Battalion, RVR; 1st Battalion, Royal South Australia Regiment (RSAR); and 1st Battalion, Royal Western Australia Regiment.

The Australian Army's experiment with the Pentropic establishment did not last long, however, as it created a number of planning issues including lack of interoperability with other Western allies, none of whom used it. As a result, it was abandoned in late 1964 and into early 1965 and the 3rd Division was once again reorganised. The resulting changes saw the establishment of brigade-level formations, briefly known as "task forces", however, due to other planning considerations only one was raised for the 3rd Division at this time: the 4th Task Force, consisting of four infantry battalions: 1, 2, 5 and 6 RVR.

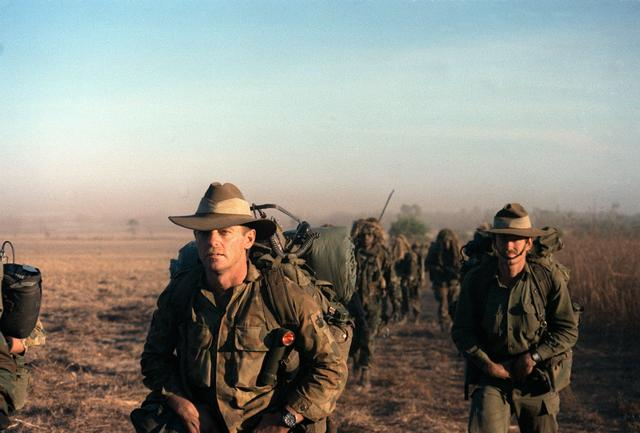
Australian and US troops taking part in Exercise Kangaroo '89 in northern Australia

At the same time, the Australian government announced that the national service scheme would be implemented once again, however, instead of focusing upon expanding the CMF, the scheme was set up so that national servicemen would serve limited terms of service in Australian Regular Army (ARA) units with a view to service overseas in Vietnam and Malaysia. This highlighted the changing focus of Australia's military planning towards Regular forces, however, it had a negative impact upon the division as essentially it was forced to compete with the ARA for manpower and although some gains were made from men that chose to serve longer national service terms in the CMF to defer their service in ARA units, these were negligible and arguably of limited quality. The government's decision not to deploy CMF units to these conflicts meant that many of the division's experienced personnel chose to transfer to ARA units to gain operational experience, although some attempts were made to rectify this situation by offering CMF officers the opportunity to undertake a short attachment to an ARA unit serving in Vietnam and a number of 3rd Division officers took up this opportunity, a few even saw combat.

When the national service scheme was ended following the election of the Whitlam government in late 1972, the 3rd Division lost a large number of personnel. At this time, the division's artillery assets included two artillery field regiments, a medium regiment, and a divisional locating battery, and although on paper the division was a large, combined arms formation, in reality many of its units were hollow and inadequately equipped, and in the decades following this the division, and indeed the CMF in general, underwent a period of uncertainty as the government attempted to solve the issues that the organisation faced, the most pressing of which was the question of its role and strategic relevance, as well as those concerning conditions of service, centralisation of training and access to equipment.

In 1976 the division's combat strength had dropped to the extent that it was really only a brigade-group formation, possessing only two infantry battalions: 1 and 2 RVR, as well as two field artillery regiments, a medium regiment and a locating battery. As a result, in February the division's headquarters were merged with the 4th Task Force's headquarters as the 3rd Division was redesignated as the "3rd Division Field Force Group". At the same time, the position of formation commander was downgraded to the rank of brigadier rather than major general. This remained the case until April 1984 when the divisional headquarters was re-established.

In the late 1980s the division was given the task of vital asset protection under the Defence of Australia doctrine and the division undertook a number of exercises in the north of Australia, including "Kangaroo 89" in which more than 3,000 of its personnel took part. Nevertheless, in June 1991, following a force structure review, the 3rd Division was finally removed from the Australian Army's order of battle, and its remaining units were transferred to the command of the 4th Brigade.

== Commanding officers ==
The following is a list of the 3rd Division's commanding officers:

From	To	Rank	Name
1916	1918	Major General	John Monash
1918	1922	Major General	John Gellibrand
1922	1927	Major General	George Johnston
1927	1931	Major General	Harold Elliott
1931	1937	Major General	Thomas Blamey
1937	1942	Major General	Edmund Drake-Brockman
1942	1944	Major General	Stanley Savige
1944	1947	Major General	William Bridgeford
1947	1950	Major General	George Wootten
1950	1953	Major General	Selwyn Porter
1953	1956	Major General	Robert Risson
1956	1959	Major General	Heathcote Hammer
1959	1960	Major General	Noel Simpson
1960	1963	Major General	R. R. Gordon
1963	1966	Major General	N. A. Vickery
1966	1970	Major General	S. M. McDonald
1970	1973	Major General	K. D. Green
1973	1976	Major General	J. M. McNeill
1976	1977	Brigadier	W. H. Grant
1977	1980	Brigadier	J. E. Barry
1980	1981	Brigadier	Neale Bavington
1981	1985	Major General	K. G. Cooke
1985	1987	Major General	Jim Barry
1987	1990	Major General	B. N. Nunn
1990	1991	Major General	W. E. Glenny

== See also ==
- Military history of Australia during World War I
- Military history of Australia during World War II
- 1916 Pioneer Exhibition Game

== Notes ==
Footnotes

Citations
