= 199th Infantry Division (German Empire) =

Imperial German Army formation during World War I

- 199. Infanterie-Division
- Active: 21 August 1916 – January 1919
- Allegiance: German Empire
- Branch: Imperial German Army
- Type: Infantry
- Engagements: World War I

Commanders
- Notable commanders: Major General Wilhelm von Puttkamer

The 199th Infantry Division (199. Infanterie-Division) was a formation of the Imperial German Army in World War I.
