= Peaceful penetration =

Infantry tactic

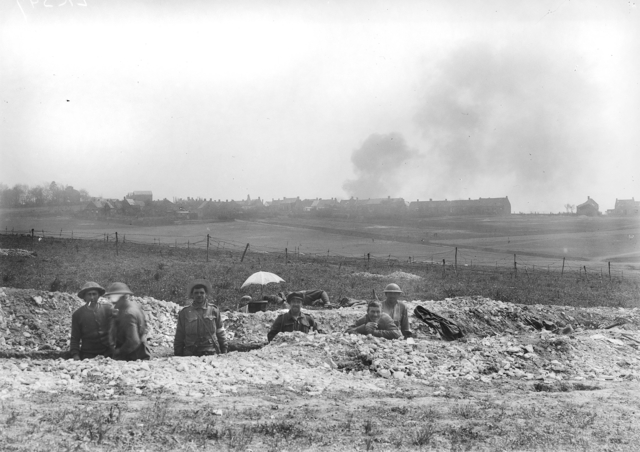
Australian troops occupying a position near Villers-Bretonneux in May 1918. Throughout April, May and June, the Australians carried out a series of raids in the sector.

Peaceful penetration was an infantry tactic used toward the end of the First World War by Australian troops, a cross between trench raiding and patrolling. The aim was similar to trench raiding (namely, to gather prisoners, conduct reconnaissance, and to dominate no man's land), with the additional purpose to occupy the enemy's outpost line (and so capture ground).

The term came most directly from the pre-war British press's description of the advancing penetration of German trade into the British Empire as "peaceful penetration".

== Description ==
=== Development ===
In mid-1918, with the ending of the German spring offensive, the Australian troops started to conduct offensive patrols into no man's land. As the front lines after the Spring Offensive lacked fortifications and were non-continuous, it was discovered that the patrols could infiltrate the German outpost line and approach the outposts from behind. In this manner, the outposts could be taken quickly, and with minimal force. This tactic was first reported as being used on 5 April 1918 by the Australian 58th Battalion, 15th Brigade, 5th Division. However, within a few weeks all five of the Australian divisions were using the tactic, with some units using the tactic more than others (for example, the 3rd Division conducted the tactic on three out of every five days in April). In some units, it was treated as a competition, with companies of the 41st Battalion competing to see who could capture the most prisoners.

A similar tactic was used in Messines in 1917, referred to as "prospecting". Likewise, an earlier trench raid was made near Messines on 16 November 1915 by the Canadians.

=== Effect on German morale ===
The effect on German morale was quite pronounced, with the effect of peaceful penetration being noticed by both the Allies and Germans. The chief of staff of the German 2nd Army issued the following report on 13 July 1918:

During the last few days the Australians have succeeded in penetrating, or taking prisoner, single posts or piquets. They have gradually—sometimes even in daylight—succeeded in getting possession of a majority of the forward zone of a whole division. Troops must fight. They must not give way at every opportunity and seek to avoid fighting... The best way to make the enemy more careful in his attempt to drive us bit by bit out of the outpost line and forward zone is to do active reconnaissance... If the enemy can succeed in scoring a success without any special support by artillery or assistance from special troops, we must be in a position to do the same.

A captured German soldier is reported as saying:

You bloody Australians, when you are in the line you keep us on pins and needles; we never know when you are coming over.

General Herbert Plumer, commander of the British 2nd Army, stated:

At the same time I would like to tell you that there is no division, certainly in my army, perhaps in the whole British Army, which has done more to destroy the morale of the enemy than the 1st Australian Division.

=== Advancement of lines ===
As ground was continually being captured on an ongoing basis by the use of peaceful penetration, the front lines were constantly being advanced. After the Battle of Hamel, a second battle was ordered by Field Marshal Douglas Haig on 11 July to attack the Villers-Bretonneux Plateau. However, barely had the planning started, when it was realised that the area (a frontage of 4,500 yards (4,100 m), to a depth of 1,000 yards (910 m)) had already been captured by two brigades through peaceful penetration. In addition, the 3rd Division forced the German front line back a mile at Morlancourt.

== Requirements ==
Peaceful penetration relied on the patrols infiltrating the German outposts, and approaching them from behind. As a result, one of the main requirements for successful peaceful penetration is that the terrain provide good cover (e.g. covered approaches such as ditches), or have enough ground cover (trees, grasses, etc.). As a result, it was only after the German Spring Offensive forced the Allies out of the previously fought over terrain into terrain that had not been damaged by artillery that peaceful penetration became feasible.

As peaceful penetration worked best when the patrols approached the outposts from behind, a lack of continuous fortifications (trenches and wire emplacements) was also required for successful peaceful penetration. As a result, this tactic was limited to areas where there was a lack of well established defences. The last requirement for successful peaceful penetration is that the patrolling troops needed to have an aggressive "spirit", or élan, to display large amounts of initiative (as the patrols would often have fewer than a dozen members) and possess great daring (as it was not uncommon for single Australian soldiers to attack, successfully, outposts containing half a dozen German soldiers). Similarly, the tactic worked best when the German soldiers were more likely to surrender than fight when attacked.

== Example of peaceful penetration ==
An example of peaceful penetration is a series of patrols carried out on 11 July 1918 that were led by lieutenants CR Morley and GE Gaskell (each patrol totalling just four men). The patrol led by Lieutenant Gaskell captured 32 Germans and three machine guns. The patrol led by Lieutenant Morley captured 36 Germans and four machine guns. As a result of leading these patrols, both lieutenants Gaskell and Morley were awarded Military Crosses, and others on the patrols received Distinguished Conduct Medals. As noted in the 1st Battalion War Diary:

The patrols continued to operate during the morning and succeeded in capturing practically the whole outpost garrison of the enemy.

At 2 pm the commanding officer decided to exploit the success of the enterprise with the result that our line was advanced... an average depth of 200 yards.

Our total captives amounted to two officers, 98 o/ranks and eight machine guns.
