= Morlancourt =

- Commune
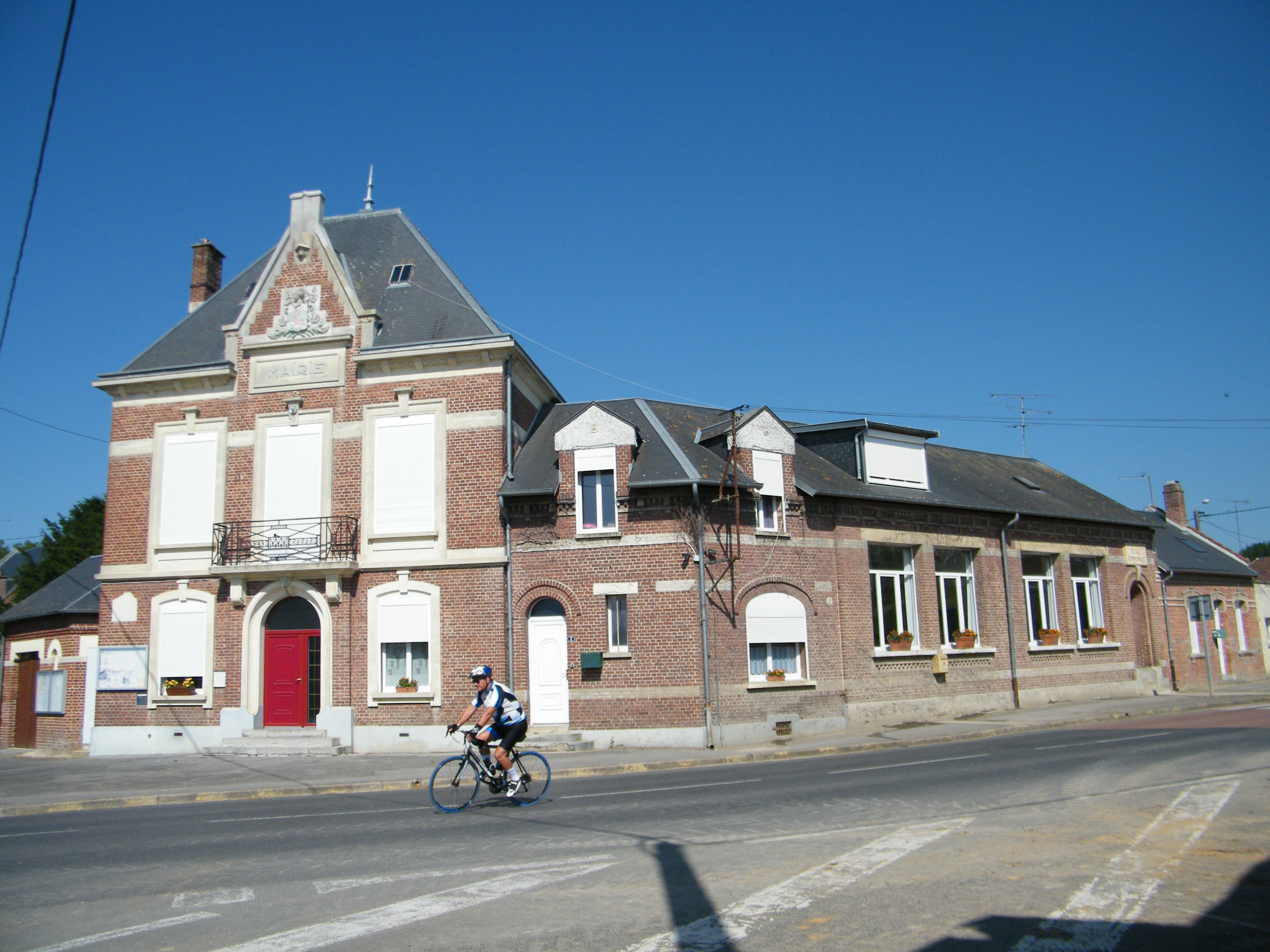
- The town hall and school in Morlancourt

- Coat of arms
- Location of Morlancourt
- Location within France Location within Hauts-de-France
- Coordinates: 49°57′06″N 2°37′46″E
- Country: France
- Region: Hauts-de-France
- Department: Somme
- Arrondissement: Péronne
- Canton: Albert
- Intercommunality: Pays du Coquelicot

Government
  - Mayor (2020–2026): Michel Destombes
- Area^{1}: 11.87 km^{2} (4.58 sq mi)
- Elevation: 89 m (292 ft)
- Highest elevation: 113 m (371 ft)
- Lowest elevation: 51 m (167 ft)
- Population (2023): 382
  - Density: 32.2/km^{2} (83.4/sq mi)
- Time zone: UTC+01:00 (CET)
  - Summer (DST): UTC+02:00 (CEST)
- INSEE/Postal code: 80572 /80300
- ^{1} French Land Register data, which excludes lakes, ponds, glaciers > 1 km^{2} (0.386 sq mi or 247 acres) and river estuaries.

Morlancourt (French pronunciation: [mɔʁlɑ̃kuʁ]) is a commune in the Somme department in Hauts-de-France in northern France.

== Geography ==
Morlancourt is situated on the D42 road, some 16 miles (26 km) northeast of Amiens.

== Population ==
Historical population
Year	Pop.	±% p.a.
1968	371	—
1975	319	−2.13%
1982	320	+0.04%
1990	335	+0.57%
1999	318	−0.58%
2007	347	+1.10%
2012	363	+0.91%
2017	371	+0.44%
2023	382	+0.49%
Source: INSEE

== Notable people ==
- Louis Friant (1758–1829), French military officer, born in Morlancourt.
- Manfred von Richthofen (1892-1918), German World War I fighter ace known as the Red Baron, died in action at Morlancourt.

== See also ==
- Communes of the Somme department
