= Irwin Barracks =

Australian Army military base in Western Australia

- Karrakatta, Western Australia in Australia
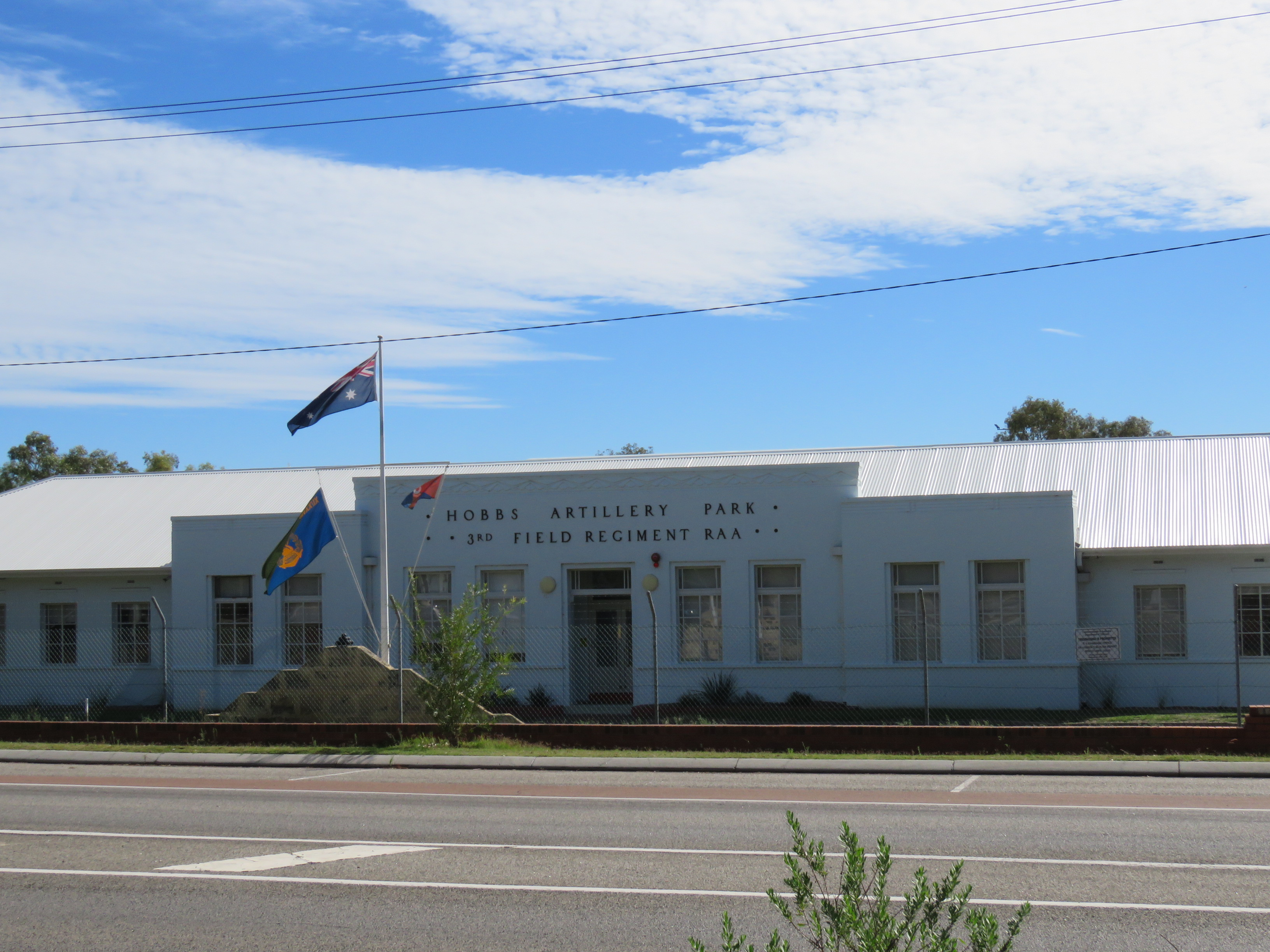
- Hobbs Artillery Park, Irwin Barracks, in May 2021

Site information
- Type: Military base
- Owner: Department of Defence
- Operator: Australian Army

Location
- Shown within Western Australia
- Coordinates: 31°57′55″S 115°47′49″E
- Area: 62 hectares (150 acres)

Site history
- Built: November 1948
- In use: 5 December 1948 – present

Garrison information
- Garrison: 13th Brigade

Irwin Barracks is an Australian Army military base located in Karrakatta, a suburb of Perth, Western Australia. It occupies a 62-hectare (150-acre) site on the western side of the Fremantle railway line.

It was previously known as Karrakatta Camp and Irwin Training Centre.

== History ==
The barracks were originally named the Irwin Training Centre on 5 December 1948 in honour of Lieutenant-Colonel Frederick Chidley Irwin, the first military commandant of Western Australia (1829–1833).

Prior to this the area was known as Karrakatta Camp and was set-aside as a military training area by the Western Australian Colonial Government in 1895. The site was used for short camps (in tented accommodation) and courses for Militia and School Cadet units until the beginning of World War II.

In 1896 a rifle range was constructed at Karrakatta and equipped with seven sets of Jeffries patented "Wimbledon" targets – only the fourth range in the world so equipped. The range replaced the original rifle range located at Mount Eliza, which was used by all metro-based troops including the Western Australian contingents, which trained at Karrakatta camp for the Second Boer War (1899–1902).

On 6 October 1898 completion of buildings for use as magazines for storage of powder and ammunition for Perth No.1 Battery were completed. The buildings were constructed of local coastal limestone with slate roofs. These buildings have walls 698.5 millimetres (2 ft 3 1/2 in) thick and floors of concrete lined with timber flooring. They still exist within the Barracks. The magazine buildings are included on the Commonwealth Heritage List as evidence of colonial defence infrastructure.

Following Federation, the site was transferred from the State of Western Australia to the Commonwealth for A£750. The site formed part of the 5th Military District and was also used for the training of citizen forces (militia) under the Commonwealth.

In 1913 the range was formally closed as it was deemed "unsafe", following the earlier death of an army cadet in November 1909, with the range relocated to a new site in Swanbourne.

The camp was modernised and expanded during World War II, housing various units, as well as 1,000 Italian prisoners of war. After the war the camp served as an accommodation centre for former members of the Polish forces who had elected to migrate to Australia. In mid-1948 the camp was chosen to serve as a training camp for the Citizen Military Forces, and on 5 December 1948 it was ceremonially renamed the Irwin Training Centre. Most of the original wooden buildings were replaced by modern brick buildings during the 1950s and 1960s, though the last wooden buildings were not demolished until the 1980s.

== Current ==
Irwin Barracks is the headquarters of 13th Brigade, an Army Reserve formation of the Australian Army.

The 13th Brigade currently consists of the following units:

- Headquarters 13th Brigade
- 10th Light Horse Regiment
- 13th Engineer Regiment
- 109th Signals Squadron
- 11th/28th Battalion, Royal Western Australia Regiment
- 16th Battalion, Royal Western Australia Regiment
- 13th Combat Service Support Battalion

The barracks also house:

- 3rd Light Battery, Royal Australian Artillery. Formerly (until 2018) a component of the 13th Brigade.
- 3 Squadron, Pilbara Regiment.
- Western Australia University Regiment.This unit has moved to Leeuwin Barracks in Fremantle.
- Headquarters Western Australia Australian Army Cadets Brigade
- 502 Army Cadet Unit Karrakatta

== Stolen APC incident ==
On 27 April 1993, 27 year old Gary Alan Hayes stole an M-113 armoured personnel carrier (APC) from the barracks. He drove it through the Perth central business district, ramming police targets and government buildings, causing damage to police and government buildings, 7 police vehicles, 5 private vehicles, and a bus stop. He was subsequently forced out of the APC with tear gas dropped into the tank. Hayes was charged with 19 counts of criminal damage, burglary and assault of police officers and was sentenced to four and a half years in Casuarina Prison with the possibility of parole after 17 months. He was diagnosed with paranoid schizophrenia.

== See also ==
- List of Australian military bases
