= 7th Field Battery, Royal Australian Artillery =

7th Battery, Royal Australian Artillery
- Active: 1965–present
- Country: Australia
- Branch: Army Reserve
- Type: Artillery
- Role: Light artillery
- Size: One battery
- Part of: 9th Regiment
- Garrison/HQ: Hobbs Artillery Park, Irwin Barracks in Perth, Western Australia
- Mottos: 'Ubique', which is Latin for 'Everywhere'.

Commanders
- Captain-General: HM The King

Insignia
- Unit colour patch

The 7th Battery, Royal Australian Artillery is a Reserve artillery unit of the Australian Army. Located in Western Australia, it is the artillery component of the 13th Brigade.

== History ==
The 7th Field Battery has its origins in the Union Troop of Western Australian Mounted Volunteers which was formed on 19 July 1870. The unit subsequently acquired two 12 pounder field artillery pieces and on 1 July 1872 became the W.A. Troop of Volunteer Horse Artillery.

With the commencement of the First World War volunteers from Western Australia's artillery militia units were grouped together as the 8th Battery, 3rd Field Artillery Brigade as part of the 1st Australian Division. Armed with 18 pounders the battery served at Gallipoli even though the terrain was not suitable for the guns. After the withdrawal from Gallipoli the battery, together with the 14th Field Battery (another West Australian battery), took part in actions on the Western Front. The last round of artillery fired at Gallipoli was from a gun belonging to the 8th Battery.

In World War II, Western Australia provided a single battery composed mainly of militia volunteers, designated the 6th Battery, 2/3rd Field Regiment. The battery was initially issued with, and trained on, 18 pounders. 6th Battery was transported to England where they were re-armed with the new 25 Pounder guns. The battery was sent to the Middle East then participated in the Greece and Crete campaigns usually in support of fellow West Australians in the 2/11th Battalion. In 1942, the battery returned to Australia then served in action throughout the South West Pacific Area.

At the end of World War II the battery was disbanded, however in 1948, P and Q Batteries of the 3rd Field Regiment were raised. In 1965, the two were renamed the 7th and 8th Batteries. In 1975 the unit was reduced to a single field battery as the 7th Field Battery, 3rd Regiment.

In 2003, the Battery consisted of a headquarters element, a command post, four 105 mm M2A2 Howitzer detachments and was part of the 13th Brigade.

Following the reorganisation of the Australian Army Reserve's artillery units as part of Plan Beersheba, the battery is now armed with the F2 81mm mortar as its primary weapon platform. It retained a number of M2A2s for ceremonial duties firing blank cartridges.

On 15 January 2018, to provide a regimental headquarters for all Australian Army Reserve mortar-equipped light batteries assigned to the 2nd Division, the 9th Regiment RAA was re-raised and all Army Reserve Artillery units were transferred to it.
