= 10th Light Horse Regiment (Australia) =

Regiment of the Australian Army

10th Light Horse Regiment ("X LH")
- 10th Light Horse Regiment cap badge
- Active: 10 October 1914 – present
- Country: Australia
- Branch: Royal Australian Armoured Corps; Army Reserve
- Type: Mounted infantry
- Role: Armoured reconnaissance
- Size: One regiment
- Part of: 13th Brigade
- Garrison/HQ: Irwin Barracks Karrakatta
- Mottos: Percute et Percute Velociter (Latin: "Strike and Strike Swiftly").
- Colours: Gold and black
- March: "Marching Song of the 3rd Light Horse Brigade (to the tune of Marching Through Georgia)"

Commanders
- Colonel-in-Chief: King Charles III (Colonel-in-Chief, RAAC)
- Notable commanders: Lieutenant Colonel Noel Brazier

Insignia
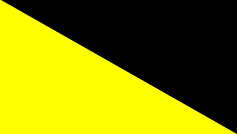
- Unit colour patch

The 10th Light Horse Regiment is a "mounted infantry" regiment of the Australian Army Reserve, raised in Western Australia (WA).

While the name of the 10th Light Horse originated in the first months of World War I, the regiment traces its ceremonial lineage to mounted infantry units of the Colonial militia of Western Australia, raised during the late 19th century, such as the Western Australian Mounted Infantry. Consequently, its battle honours include: "South Africa" (Boer War) and; "Gallipoli", "Gaza-Beersheba", "Jerusalem", "Megiddo" and "Damascus" (World War I).

At present, the Bushmaster Protected Mobility Vehicle, the 6x6 Surveillance & Reconnaissance Vehicles – a variant of the Mercedes-Benz G-Wagon – and the Hawkei PMV comprise the regiment's key operational vehicles. It is part of the 13th Brigade, a reserve formation encompassing most reserve personnel in WA and is based at Irwin Barracks, Karrakatta, where it consists of two squadrons. Because of its operational role, the regiment's administrative grouping is the Royal Australian Armoured Corps.

== History ==
=== Early years ===
In Western Australia, prior to Federation, it was the custom for the volunteer infantry at major centres to form, within themselves, small bodies of mounted infantry for the purpose of performing certain cavalry duties. By 1900, records indicate that at least four such bodies existed, these being at Perth, Guildford, Geraldton and Bunbury. These units were brought together under a single command and took the title of the Western Australia Mounted Infantry (WAMI).

During the Boer War, Western Australia despatched five contingents to South Africa bearing the name Western Australia Mounted Infantry (WAMI), although these contingents were not part of the part-time Western Australian mounted volunteer who also bore this same name.

In 1903, the Commonwealth re-organised the whole framework of the Australian defence forces. Since there was no money for a standing army, the military was organised on a part-time paid militia model while its strategy bore remarkable similarity to their erstwhile enemy's military organisation. By a combination of rifle clubs, infantry regiments and mounted units, the defence of Western Australia was based on the concept of guerrilla war being waged on any potential invader. At that time, although not stated publicly, the big fear was a Japanese invasion. In line with all the changes, the West Australian mounted militia formation was called the 18th Australian Light Horse, with the territorial title remaining as the Western Australia Mounted Infantry (WAMI).

For Western Australians in London who wanted to continue their mounted service, an exchange programme was commenced allying the WAMI with a British Territorial unit known as King Edward's Horse or The King's Overseas Dominions Regiment. From 1908, any Western Australian could serve in either regiment without any break in their service, a most important factor for officer seniority.

After the Kitchener Report, the defence structure of Australia was again changed to enlarge the units through conscription. The regiment's title was changed in July 1912 to the 25th Australian Light Horse, part of the Citizens Force, with the territorial title once again remaining as the Western Australia Mounted Infantry (WAMI). Like all units, nearly all the former members were purged and replaced by conscripts. Unfortunately, the cost for the individual of being in the Light Horse was in excess of the sustenance allowance received and the numbers dropped alarmingly. The man whose personal energy singularly saved the WAMI from oblivion during this period was Noel Brazier, an officer from Kirup, Western Australia. For his efforts he became the regiment's commanding officer on 11 May 1913.

=== First World War ===
For several weeks following the outbreak of World War I, "light horsemen" (mounted infantry) from the 5th Military District (WA) who had volunteered for overseas service with the Army's Australian Imperial Force (AIF), were formed into "C" Squadron of the 7th Light Horse Regiment. While the Army had planned only to raise a squadron-sized light horse unit, the numbers of volunteers grew so quickly that a decision was made to raise an entire regiment of Western Australians. On 10 October 1914, "C" Squadron was officially re-designated the 10th Light Horse Regiment. It was the only AIF light horse unit raised in Western Australia.

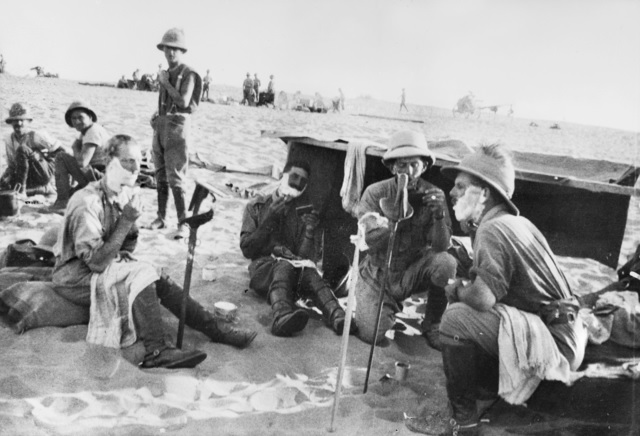
Officers of the 10th Light Horse Regiment shaving prior to the Battle of Romani in July 1916. The officer on the left is Horace Robertson

Training was undertaken in several locations across the state: regional troops were drilled in their home towns, and later training took place at Guildford, the Claremont Showground, and finally the entire regiment was sent by ship to Rockingham, arriving in early January 1915. During this move the horses, being walked from Guildford by 150 members of the regiment, stampeded in the night. Several were killed and many more scattered across the sparsely populated region. The regiment was sent to Egypt as part of the 3rd Light Horse Brigade, embarking from Fremantle on the Mashobra in two stages, beginning 7 February 1915, arriving on 8 March 1915.

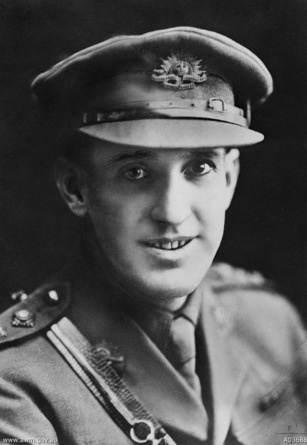
Hugo Throssell (1884–1933), a Captain of the 10th and the only light horseman during the First World War to be awarded the Victoria Cross

The regiment's first action of the war came during the Gallipoli campaign. Due to the terrain and the static nature of the fighting on the peninsula, it was felt that mounted units could not play a part; however, a number of light horse units were deployed in a dismounted role as infantry. The 10th Light Horse Regiment arrived at Gallipoli on 20 May 1915 and initially it was largely used in a defensive role. In August, however, the Allies attempted to break the stalemate, launching the August Offensive. The regiment's action at the Nek during this offensive was immortalised in the final scenes of the 1981 Peter Weir film Gallipoli. It was also involved in the Battle of Hill 60 later in August before being evacuated along with the rest of the Allied troops in December 1915.

Reverting to its original mounted infantry role, the regiment saw service in the Middle East for the remainder of the war, taking part in numerous actions including those at Romani and Beersheba. The regiment was later given the honour of leading the Australian Mounted Division, and accepted the formal surrender of the city of Damascus on 1 October 1918. Later, while awaiting repatriation, the regiment was used to suppress a nationalist uprising in Egypt in 1919. Following its return to Australia, the 10th Light Horse Regiment was disbanded in 1919.

During its service during the war, the regiment suffered 237 killed and 479 wounded. Its members received the following decorations: one Victoria Cross, one Companion of the Order of St Michael and St George, three Distinguished Service Orders and one Bar, one Member of the Order of the British Empire, nine Military Crosses and one Bar, 15 Distinguished Conduct Medals and one Bar, 15 Military Medals, three Meritorious Service Medals, 48 Mentions in Despatches and four foreign awards. Hugo Throssell was the regiment's sole Victoria Cross recipient.

=== Inter war years and Second World War ===
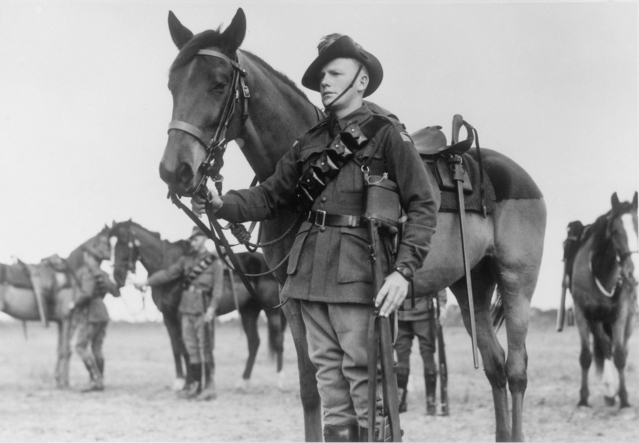
Trooper K. Butcher with his horse in July 1943. Butcher was the winner of the 10th Light Horse Regiment's "Best turned out light horseman" competition at the unit's annual sports day

In order to perpetuate the traditions and distinctions of the Australian Imperial Force, it was decided in July 1919 that all CMF units would be re-designated with the unit numbers of the AIF. From this date, the 25th Australian Light Horse Regiment was renamed the 10th Australia Light Horse Regiment, while retaining the territorial title Western Australia Mounted Infantry (WAMI).

One final recognition was given in 1923 when the regiment was finally awarded the right to carry the battle honours for the Second Boer War. Initially, these had been granted to the Western Australian infantry regiments but not to the mounted regiment. This oversight was corrected and from this time they bore these battle honours in addition to those granted to the AIF 10th light Horse Regiment.

The regiment was called up for training in November 1939, spending a month camped just south of Woodman Point on the location of the abandoned Naval Base. They returned in January 1940 for three months' training, during which time they were visited by Lord Gowrie, the Governor-General.

During the Second World War, the regiment underwent several name changes in order to show its varying roles. In 1943, it was gazetted as an Australian Imperial Force unit, after the majority of its personnel volunteered to serve overseas. This did not occur, though, and instead, its main task was the defence of south-west Australia. During this period, the regiment was also partially mechanised, although it did retain horses which were used to patrol the coastline. It was the last regiment in Australia to employ horses. It was disbanded on 14 April 1944.

=== Post Second World War ===
After the war, it was reformed as a single squadron in 1949, when it became fully mechanised and was renamed the 10th Western Australian Mounted Infantry, operating Staghound and Canadian Scout armoured cars. Expanded to a full regiment in 1952, it was again renamed as the 10th Light Horse in 1956 when it was equipped with Staghounds, Saracens and Ferrets, before being reduced to a single independent squadron again in 1976.

The squadron remained independent until 2001, when it formally became a part of the Army Reserve's 13th Brigade. The regiment was until recently equipped with the M113 vehicle in the armoured reconnaissance role, and the Land Rover 6x6 LRPV and Regional Force Surveillance Vehicle, in the light cavalry/reconnaissance role. As a part of the Australian Army's Plan Beersheba, the squadron received the Bushmaster Protected Mobility Vehicle to be employed in the dual role of reconnaissance/surveillance and protected lift. Under Plan Beersheba the squadron was task with pairing with Regular and Reserve cavalry units to provide Bushmaster crews in support of the ready multi-role combat brigade.

In October 2021, the 10th Light Horse was re-raised from a single squadron to full regimental status. This involves forming a regimental headquarters to command the existing 'A' Squadron and re-raising of 'B' Squadron. The process is expected to be completed over a two-year period, increasing the size of the unit to over 170 personnel. During this time, the regiment took delivery of its first Hawkei PMVs.

Personnel from the squadron have been deployed to the Solomon Islands as part of RAMSI, Timor Leste, and Afghanistan, where they have been deployed with Regular Army units.

== Battle honours ==
The regiment has received the following battle honours:

- Boer War: South Africa 1900–1902;
- First World War: ANZAC, Defence at ANZAC, Suvla, Sari Bair, Gallipoli 1915–1916, Romani, Magdhaba–Rafah, Egypt 1915–1917, Gaza–Beersheba, El Mughar, Nebi Samwil, Jerusalem, Jordan (Es Salt), Megiddo, Sharon, Damascus, Palestine 1917–1918.

== Alliances ==
- United Kingdom – The King's Royal Hussars.

== In popular culture ==
The 10th Light Horse Regiment is portrayed in the 1981 film Gallipoli featuring actor Mel Gibson.
