= HMAS Leeuwin (naval base) =

Military base in Perth, Western Australia

Leeuwin Barracks
- HMAS Leeuwin
- Fremantle, Western Australia in Australia

Site information
- Type: Naval base (1940–1984); Army barracks (1986–present)
- Owner: Department of Defence
- Operator: Royal Australian Navy (1940–1984); Australian Army (1986–present)

Location
- Location in Western Australia
- Coordinates: 32°1′42″S 115°45′57″E
- Area: 14.30 ha (35.3 acres)

Site history
- In use: 1 August 1940 – present

HMAS Leeuwin is a former Royal Australian Navy (RAN) shore establishment, (Note: Like most Commonwealth navies, the RAN considers its shore facilities to be stone frigates, and names them as ships.) located in Fremantle, Western Australia. In use between 1940 and 1984, the base reopened in 1986 under the control of the Australian Army as Leeuwin Barracks.

Commissioned in August 1940 as the naval depot for Fremantle, the base was adopted for use as a training facility after World War II, initially for RAN reservists and national servicemen, then as the Junior Recruit Training Establishment (JRTE) from 1960 until 1984. There was widespread sexual and physical abuse of trainees at the JRTE, with 10% of reports investigated by the Defence Abuse Response Taskforce relating to incidents at Leeuwin. Decommissioned from naval service in 1986, the base was later reopened under the control of the Australian Army as Leeuwin Barracks. In 2015, the Australian Government announced that the Leeuwin site will be sold off for residential development, but in 2021 they suspended the divestment process for Leeuwin Barracks.

== History ==
Leeuwin was commissioned into the RAN on 1 August 1940 as the naval depot for Fremantle. The base was named after the Dutch galleon Leeuwin ('lioness'), which accidentally discovered the south-east coast of Western Australia in 1622 while sailing to Batavia. The ship's badge assigned to the base was based on the Coat of arms of the Netherlands. The original facility was centred on a drill hall constructed in 1926 in East Fremantle, which prior to commissioning as Leeuwin was identified as Cerberus V, a sub-base of HMAS Cerberus in Victoria. In 1942, Leeuwin was relocated to Preston Point, on the other side of the Swan River.

After World War II, Leeuwin was tasked with training reservists and national servicemen. The base was reclassified as the Junior Recruit Training Establishment (JRTE) in 1960: adolescents who joined the RAN between the ages of fifteen years and six months and sixteen years and six months, would attend the JRTE for a year of secondary education along with basic naval training, before they were sent to other bases for training in their speciality. Education and training of junior recruits was shared with the Royal Australian Naval College at HMAS Creswell, located on Jervis Bay, New South Wales. The first JRTE intake consisted of 155 recruits, and by the end of the decade, over 800 junior recruits and 100 officer candidates were in residence. The JRTE was closed in 1984, after having educated 12,074 recruits: the improving quality of education in Australia meant that the RAN no longer felt the need to provide secondary education to those wishing to join the navy. Leeuwin was decommissioned on 11 November 1986: one of several RAN facilities closed during the late 1980s and early 1990s because of funding cuts and the rationalisation and consolidation of shore bases.

Control of the base was handed over to the Australian Army, which operated it as Leeuwin Barracks. The Army began using the base in 1987 for the Western Australia University Regiment, initially as temporary accommodation along with Irwin Barracks, then permanently by 2009. The Barracks provides support for personnel of all three branches of the Australian military in the Fremantle area. The RAN maintains control of the wharves and boatsheds, and uses the base to host the Fremantle Port Division of the Royal Australian Navy Reserve.

In June 2014, the Defence Abuse Response Taskforce (DART) investigation into sexual and other abuse in the Australian Defence Force (ADF) reported that there had been widespread abuse of teenage trainees at the JRTE. During the two-year DART investigation, 238 complaints of abuse at the JRTE (making up 10% of the cases investigated by the task force) were assessed and found to be plausible. Many of the reported instances of sexual and physical abuse were committed by senior trainees as part of initiation hazing of younger recruits, while others were the acts of naval personnel against the trainees. Taskforce head Len Roberts-Smith concluded that the abuse was so widespread that Defence had to know about and be ignoring it. Some of the reported cases were referred to the ADF or police for further investigation, and the DART report into the Leeuwin assaults has been forwarded to the Royal Commission into Institutional Responses to Child Sexual Abuse for possible inclusion under the Royal Commission's scope.

In June 2015, the Australian government announced that the Leeuwin site no longer has strategic value, and will be sold for residential development. Defence units and assets will be relocated to Irwin Barracks in Karrakatta. Around 250 dwellings were expected to be constructed on the 14.30-hectare (35.3-acre) site.

== See also ==
- List of former Royal Australian Navy bases
- List of Australian military bases
