= 13th Engineer Regiment (Australia) =

Australian Army Reserve unit

- Active: 1 July 2022 – present
- Country: Australia
- Branch: Australian Army
- Type: Military engineering
- Part of: 13th Brigade
- Garrison/HQ: Irwin Barracks, Karrakatta
- Mascot(s): 'Little Red Devil'

13th Engineer Regiment (13ER) is an Army Reserve unit of the Royal Australian Engineers of the Australian Army. The regiment provides the combat engineering capability of the Western Australia based reserve 13th Brigade. The regiment often supports the Royal Western Australia Regiment.

== History ==
The regiment was formed on 1 July 2022 from the 13th Field Squadron. 13th Field Squadron tracing its origins to the 7th Field Company formed in 1907. In 1909 it was renamed the 4th Field Company and changed again to the 6th Field Company in 1910, and finally the 13th Field Company on 1 July 1912. The unit's first major operation was constructing a suspension bridge over the Helena River at Guildford in Western Australia. The Company was not deployed during the First World War, although 100 of its personnel were attached to the First Australian Imperial Force and served at Gallipoli with the 2nd Field Company and in Palestine and France with the 6th Field Company.

In the Second World War the Company served in Darwin in March 1943 before being deployed to New Britain in October 1944, where its major assignment was the construction of a 10,000 ton jetty. It was disbanded after the war in 1946 until it was reraised as the 13th Field Squadron, Citizens Military Force (the precursor to the Army Reserve). It adopted the mascot of a 'little red devil' in the early 1960s, and was made part of the 13th Brigade on 1 February 1988.

== Structure ==
The regiment consists of:

- Regimental headquarters
- 13th Field Squadron
- 22nd Engineer Squadron

The 13th Field Squadron consists of two combat engineer troops, a training troop and a support troop.
