= 11th Engineer Regiment (Australia) =

- Active: 1 January 2014 – present
- Country: Australia
- Branch: Army
- Type: Royal Australian Engineers (RAE)
- Role: Combat and construction engineers
- Part of: 11th Brigade
- Garrison/HQ: Gallipoli Barracks, Enoggera
- Anniversaries: 18 June (Waterloo Dinner)

Commanders
- Current Commander: Lieutenant Colonel Clinton Shiell (February 2026 – present)

Insignia
- Unit colour patch
- Abbreviation: 11 ER

The 11th Engineer Regiment (11ER) is an Australian Army Reserve engineer regiment trained for sapper/combat engineer and construction engineer operations. While 11 ER was formed on 1 January 2014 as a result of recent Australian Army modernisation efforts, 11 ER's lineage is traced back to early Queensland volunteer engineer units as early as 1879. In 1916, 11th Field Company (11 Fd Coy) was formed and during World War I, this unit was renowned for action during the Battle of the Somme and the Hindenburg Line. During World War II, it fought the Japanese during the Kokoda Track campaign and on Bougainville Island. The Regiment's Headquarters is located at Gallipoli Barracks in Brisbane, Queensland with subunits located across Queensland. 11ER is part of 11th Brigade, attached to Forces Command.

== History ==
=== Pre World War I ===
As a Queensland unit, 11th Engineer Regiment traces its history back to 19th century Queensland based volunteer engineer units. In 1879, an engineer unit was formed in Brisbane. In response to international tensions with Russia in 1885, further engineer capability was developed by the Queensland Defence Force (QDF) and focused on supporting garrison defences with submarine mining. By 1900, a submarine mining drill shed was built at Alice Street, Brisbane. In 1903, just after the Federation of Australia and the amalgamation of the previously separate colonial defence forces into one Australian defence force, the Queensland Garrison consisted of No. 5 Field Company, Electric Section and No. 3 Submarine Mining Company. In 1912, after the 1910 Kitchener Review, No. 3 Electric Company Royal Australian Engineers and No 5 FTE Royal Australian Engineers, both Brisbane units, were disbanded.

In 1913, engineer units in Queensland consisted of 15th, 23rd and 32nd Field Companies of the Royal Australian Engineers located in Brisbane, the 1st Eng Royal Australian Engineers at Maryborough and the 2nd Eng Royal Australian Engineers at Ipswich. In October 1915, 23rd and 15th Engineer Companies were accommodated in a newly constructed Engineer's depot at what is now called Gona Barracks in Kelvin Grove. This two-storey timber building was rectangular in shape, and was constructed to the design of Queensland Public Works Department architects. This building was completed at a cost of just over £1500 and included two wagon sheds and two harness rooms.

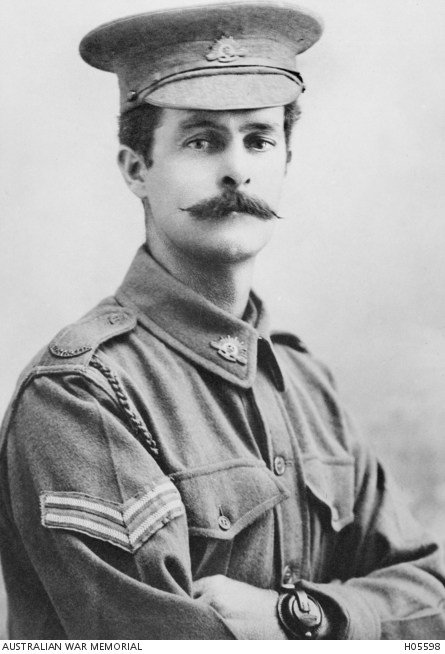
9434 Corporal Andrew John Renwick, 11th Field Company, Australian Engineers, Killed in Action 29 June 1917, Belgium.

=== World War I ===
The 11th Engineer Regiment's lineage is linked to the 11th Field Company, Australian Engineers (AE), which consisted of Queensland and South Australian soldiers who concentrated in Mitcham Camp on the 29 April 1916. The 11th Field Company was raised for overseas service with the First Australian Imperial Force (AIF) and served with distinction in France during World War I, where it saw action in the Battle of the Somme and the Hindenburg Line before returning to Australia and disbandment in 1919.

In 1921 the Australian government decided to restructure the part-time Citizens Forces units to replicate the numerical designations and perpetuate the honours of the AIF. As a result, on 1 May 1921, the unit was re-raised as the 7th Field Company of the 1st Division, based in Ipswich.

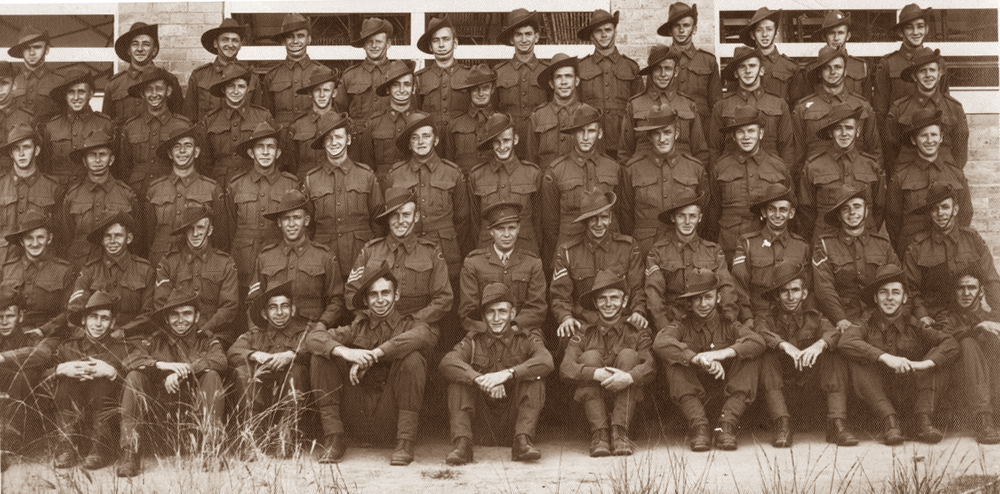
No. 2 Section, 2/11 Field Company RAE, Redbank, Qld, Australia, 1941 prior to deploying to Timor as part of Sparrow Force.

=== World War II ===
Due to the provisions of the Defence Act (1903) which precluded deploying the Militia outside of Australian territory, following the outbreak of World War II, the Australian government decided to raise an all volunteer force for overseas service, known as the Second Australian Imperial Force (2nd AIF). During this time the units of the Militia undertook brief periods of continuous service to participate in training and other defensive tasks in Australia in an effort to improve the nation's defences in case of war in the Pacific. With Japan's entry into the war following the attacks on Pearl Harbor, Hong Kong and Malaya, the strategic situation worsened and units of the Militia were mobilised for war service. No. 2 Section 2/11 Field Company was deployed to Timor in support of Sparrow Force in December 1941. 7 Field Company was called out for full-time service in May 1942 and was eventually gazetted as an Australian Imperial Force unit. The unit served in Papua New Guinea and fought against the Japanese along the Kokoda Track and on Bougainville Island until the end of the war. 7 Field Company returned to Australia on 3 January 1946 and disbanded once again on 4 February 1946. A second Queensland unit, the 11th Field Company, which had been based at Kelvin Grove and Toowong before the war, also saw active service in New Guinea and Bougainville during this time.

=== Post World War II ===
On 1 December 1971, Divisional Engineers reorganised into regiments and 7 Field Squadron became part of the 2nd Field Engineer Regiment (2 FER). 2 FER consisted of 7 Fd Sqn, 2 Field Squadron (2 Fd Sqn), 24 Support Squadron (24 Spt Sqn) and a Workshops. 17 Construction Squadron, on its return from Vietnam in late 1971, was renamed 17 Field Squadron (17 Fd Sqn) and in mid-1973 was merged with 7 Fd Sqn, 2 FER.

In August 1981, 2 FER became 2/3 FER following the disbandment of 1 FER and the merging of 3 FER. 2/3 FER was based at Enoggera, Queensland and consisted of 1 Field Squadron (Holsworthy), 7 Fd Sqn (Enoggera), 18 Field Squadron (Townsville) and a Workshop. In July 1987, 35 Field Squadron and 11 Field Squadron (11 Fd Sqn—formerly 11th Field Company and ex-5 FER located at Kelvin Grove and Ipswich), was transferred to 2/3 FER.

Following the Force Structure Review in 1991, 2/3 FER was restructured into 1, 2 and 3 Combat Engineer Regiments (CERs) with 2 CER being raised first on 24 November 1991 and remaining at Enoggera as part of 7th Brigade. During the Ready Reserve implementation of the 1990s, 2 CER increased its establishment of Reserve members. These members were initially concentrated in 7 Combat Engineer Squadron, however by 2003, these reservists were eventually concentrated in 11 Combat Engineer Squadron.

After the implementation of Plan Beersheba in 2013, 11 Combat Engineering Squadron transferred to the newly titled 11 ER on 1 January 2015. 11 ER now comprises two Combat Engineer Squadrons and a Construction Squadron. In 2015, 104 Construction Squadron commenced the renovation of the historic Ipswich Training Depot, signaling a symbolic return of military engineering back to Ipswich.

== Composition/Location ==
The regiment consists of the following:

- Regimental HQ (Enoggera)
  - 11 Works Section (Enoggera)
  - 35 Combat Engineer Squadron (Townsville)
    - 1 Combat Engineer Troop (Townsville)
    - 2 Mobility Support Troop (Townsville)
    - 3 Combat Engineer Troop (Rockhampton)
  - 11 Combat Engineer Squadron (Enoggera)
    - 27 Combat Engineer Troop (Enoggera)
    - 28 Combat Engineer Troop (Enoggera)
    - 29 Combat Engineer Troop (Enoggera)
  - 104 Construction Squadron (Ipswich)
    - Plant Troop (Greenbank)
    - Construction Troop (Ipswich)
    - Resources Troop (Ipswich)
  - 11 CIMIC Tactical Support Team (Enoggera)
