= Harold Pope (soldier) =

Australian Army soldier

- Born: 16 October 1873; Ealing, Middlesex, England
- Died: 13 May 1938 (aged 64); Perth, Western Australia
- Burial place: Karrakatta Cemetery
- Military career
- Allegiance: Australia
- Branch: Australian Army
- Service years: 1900–c.1926
- Rank: Colonel
- Commands: 52nd Battalion (1917–18); 14th Brigade (1916); 16th Battalion (1914–16)
- Conflicts: First World War; Gallipoli Campaign; Landing at Anzac Cove; Battle for Baby 700; Battle of Sari Bair; Western Front; Battle of Fromelles; Battle of Messines
- Awards: Companion of the Order of the Bath; Colonial Auxiliary Forces Officers' Decoration; Mentioned in Despatches (2)
- Other work: Commissioner of Railways, Western Australia

Colonel Harold Pope, CB, VD (16 October 1873 – 13 May 1938) was a soldier in the Australian Army during the First World War and was later Commissioner of Railways in Western Australia.

Born in England in 1873, Pope worked as a clerk in the Great Northern Railway before emigrating to Western Australia in 1895. He continued to work in the railways but also served in the Western Australian Military Forces. He volunteered for the Australian Imperial Force (AIF) on the outbreak of the First World War and was appointed a battalion commander. He served during the Gallipoli Campaign and later on the Western Front, where he commanded the 14th Brigade. In July 1916 he was sacked at the conclusion of the Attack at Fromelles, on his commanding officer's belief that he was drunk. Sent home to Australia despite his claims of innocence, he agitated to be returned to active duty. In March 1917 he was successful and was made commander of the 52nd Battalion. Wounded during the Battle of Messines, he was repatriated to Australia in early 1918.

After the war he was appointed Commissioner of Railways in Western Australia and implemented a number of changes to a rail service in difficulties. He resigned from the role on account of his health in 1928 and died ten years later in Perth.

== Early life ==
Harold Pope was born in England, at the town of Ealing, Middlesex on 16 October 1873. His father, Edward Pope, was a solicitor. He attended a school at Margate and at St. Saviour's College in Ardingly. When he was 16, he began working as a clerk at the Great Northern Railway. In 1895, he emigrated to Western Australia and found employment on the railways. The following year he married Susan Matilda Slater at Albany. He joined the Western Australian Military Forces in 1900, initially serving as a second lieutenant. By 1908, he had risen in rank to lieutenant colonel.

== First World War ==
Following the outbreak of the First World War, Pope volunteered for the Australian Imperial Force (AIF) and was given command of the 16th Battalion. He took part in the Landing at Anzac Cove late in the day on 25 April 1915 and secured a gap in the defences at a feature that would soon be known as Pope's Hill. He continued to lead his battalion over the next months, including through the Battle for Baby 700 and Battle of Sari Bair. In October 1915, he briefly commanded the 4th Brigade before being evacuated sick later that month. By this stage of the campaign he had been mentioned in despatches and appointed a Companion of the Order of the Bath.

On recovering his health, Pope resumed command of the 16th Battalion. He was promoted temporary colonel on 1 May 1916 and appointed commander of the 14th Brigade, part of the 5th Division, which was training in Egypt. It was soon transferred to the Western Front and from 19 to 20 July 1916, the brigade was involved in the Attack at Fromelles during which it suffered over 2,000 casualties. Pope became exhausted as a result of preparing for the battle and conducting his command during the fighting. After having ordered his brigade to withdraw on the second day of the battle, he fell asleep and was unable to be roused by his commanding officer, Major General James M'Cay. Pope was sacked as brigade commander the next day, M'Cay believing that he was drunk. Denying this allegation, Pope sought a court martial to present witnesses and argue his case. The AIF commander, Lieutenant General William Birdwood did not permit the court martial.

Having lost his temporary rank, Pope returned to Australia and was discharged from the AIF. Determined to restore his reputation, he agitated the Australian Government for a return to the Western Front. He secured an unpaid position as a continuous service officer aboard a transport ship, the Hororata, which was sailing for England. Once there, he continued to present his case for a return to active duty. Eventually Birdwood offered to make him commander of the 52nd Battalion. He took his new command in March 1917 and led it during the Battle of Messines in June. Wounded at Messines, he was sent home in early 1918, having received a further mention in despatches. Promoted colonel on 31 May and, still seeking a role in the war effort, he performed duties on transport ships in 1919.

== Later life ==
In March 1919, Pope returned to Western Australia and later in the year was made that state's acting Commissioner of Railways. The appointment was made permanent the following year. His work was demanding and he had to deal with the consequences of poor management by the previous administration, implementing several changes. Having completed the five-year term of the role, in 1925 he was reappointed for a further term. Concurrent with his second term as Commissioner of Railways, Pope was honorary colonel of the 16th Battalion. In 1926, he served for a year as aide-de-camp to the Governor-General of Australia. His health declined and in 1928 he resigned.

Pope died of heart disease on 13 May 1938 in a hospital at Perth, where he had been under care for several months. He was survived by his wife and five children. His family declined an offer of a full military funeral and he was buried at Karrakatta Cemetery in Perth.
