= 11th/28th Battalion, Royal Western Australia Regiment =

Australian Army Reserve unit

11th/28th Battalion The Royal Western Australia Regiment
- The Royal Western Australia Regiment cap badge
- Active: 1987–present
- Country: Australia
- Branch: Army Reserve
- Type: Infantry
- Role: Light infantry
- Size: One battalion
- Part of: 13th Brigade
- Garrison/HQ: Karrakatta

Insignia
- Unit colour patch

The 11th/28th Battalion, Royal Western Australia Regiment (11/28 RWAR) is a Reserve infantry battalion of the Australian Army. Located in Western Australia, it is one of the two battalions of the Royal Western Australia Regiment which forms the infantry component of the 13th Brigade.

== History ==
The 11th/28th Battalion, Royal Western Australia Regiment was formed in 1987 by the amalgamation of the 11th and 28th Battalions. These two battalions both trace their history back to units formed for service in the First World War, although they also perpetuate previous units that served during the Second Boer War.

The 11th Battalion was raised at Black Boy Hill Camp on 17 August 1914 as part of the Australian Imperial Force (AIF). Attached to the 3rd Brigade, 1st Division, it was one of the first units raised in Australia following the outbreak of the war. After training in Egypt, the 11th Battalion landed at Anzac Cove and fought throughout the Gallipoli campaign. After being withdrawn from Gallipoli the battalion served with distinction on the Western Front in France and Belgium until the end of the war. Following the end of hostilities, the 11th returned to Western Australia and was disbanded on 5 February 1919.

In 1921 the decision was made to perpetuate the designations and battle honours of the AIF by reforming these units as part of the Militia. In 1927 territorial titles were adopted and the battalion became the 11th Battalion (City of Perth Regiment). During the economic hardships of the 1930s the battalion was briefly amalgamated with the 16th Battalion, however, in 1936, in response to the reoccupation of the Rhineland by German military forces, the Australian government decided to expand the Militia; as a result, the two units were delinked once again.

At the outbreak of the Second World War, due to the provisions of the Defence Act (1903) which precluded sending the Militia outside of Australian territory to fight, it was decided to raise an all volunteer force for overseas service. This force was known as the Second Australian Imperial Force (2nd AIF). The infantry units of the 2nd AIF adopted the same designations as those of the 1st AIF, with the prefix numeral '2' in front to differentiate them from the Militia battalions that continued to exist. As result, during the war there were two battalions to bare the numerals 11th Battalion. The 2/11th Battalion was attached to the 6th Division and served in the Western Sahara, Greece, Crete and the Tobruk, as well as in the Pacific. At the same time, the Militia 11th Battalion (City of Perth Regiment) was attached to the 13th Brigade, 4th Division and spent most of its active service on garrison duties in Australia before taking part in the New Britain campaign in 1944–45.

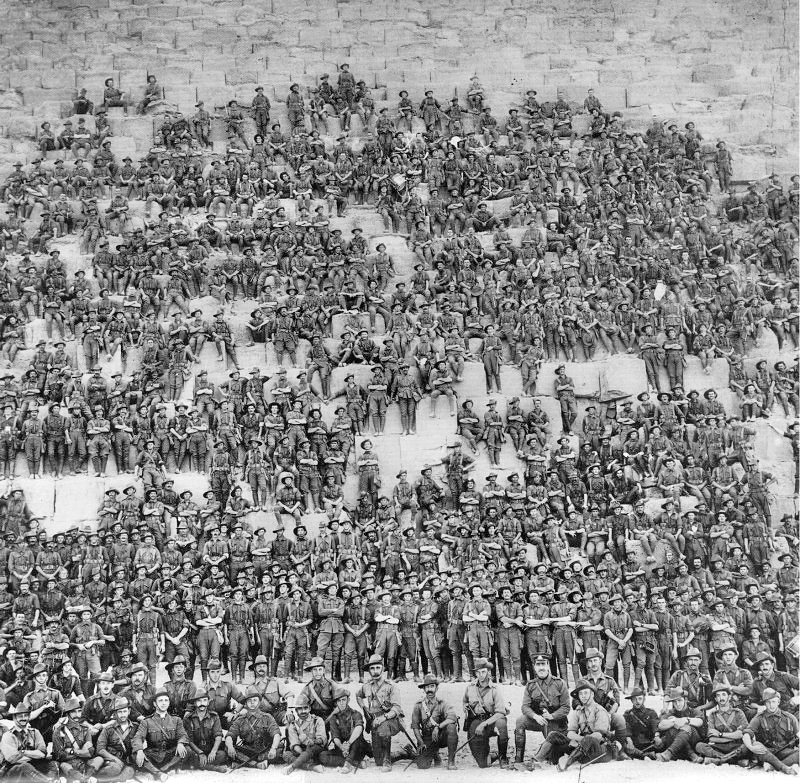
11th Battalion posing on the Great Pyramid of Giza, 1915.

The 28th Battalion shared a similar history to the 11th, being formed in 1915 as part of the 7th Brigade and fighting in Gallipoli, France and Belgium during the First World War. Following the war, it was re-raised as the 28th Battalion (Swan Regiment) in 1921 and was based in east Perth.

During the Second World War, the 2/28th Battalion served with the 9th Division at Tobruk, El Alamein, New Guinea and Borneo, while the 28th Battalion (Swan Regiment) fought in New Britain alongside the 11th Battalion in 1944–45.

Following the end of the war, these four units were disbanded. In 1948, when Australia's part-time military forces were re-raised as the Citizens Military Force (CMF), the 16th/28th Infantry Battalion was formed. They remained joined until 1952 when the two units were split once again. In 1960, when the Australian Army was reorganised along Pentropic lines, the regional regiments were amalgamated into multi-battalion State-based regiments. As a result, both the 16th and 28th Battalions were reduced to company-level formations within the larger 1st Battalion, Royal Western Australia Regiment, with the 16th providing one company known as 'B' (The Cameron Company), and the 28th providing one company known as 'A' (The Swan Company).

The 11th Battalion was also re-raised in 1948, although it was re-raised as an amalgamated unit known as the 11th/44th Battalion (The City of Perth Regiment). They remained on the order of battle until 1960 when they became a company-level organisation within the Pentropic 1st Battalion, Royal Western Australia Regiment, known as 'A' (The City of Perth Company).

In 1966, following the decision to revert to the tropical establishment and reorganise the CMF, the 28th Battalion was reformed as the 28th Battalion, Royal Western Australia Regiment, and the following year the 11th Battalion was also reformed. In 1977, both units were redesignated as independent rifle companies; however, in 1987 they were amalgamated together to form the current unit known as the 11th/28th Battalion, Royal Western Australia Regiment.

11/28 RWAR currently consists of:

- Battalion Headquarters
- 2 Rifle Companies – ‘A’ and ‘C’
- Support Company – Mortar Platoon, Direct Fire Support Weapons (DFSW) platoon, Signals platoon.

== Battle honours ==
The 11th/28th Battalion, Royal Western Australia Regiment currently holds the following battle honours:

- Boer War: South Africa 1899–1902. (Note: Inherited from the Western Australia Mounted Infantry.)
- First World War: Somme 1916–1918, Pozieres, Bullecourt, Ypres 1917, Menin Road, Polygon Wood, Broodseinde, Poelcappelle, Passchendaele, Amiens, Albert 1918, Mont Saint Quentin, Hindenburg Line, Beaurevoir, Lys, France and Flanders 1916–1918, Hazebrouck, Epehy, Landing at Anzac, Defence of Anzac, Suvla, Sari-Bair, Gallipoli, Egypt 1915–1916. (Note: Inherited from the 11th and 28th Battalions.)
- Second World War: Bardia 1941, Lae–Nadzab, North Africa 1940–1941, Busu River, North Africa 1941–1942, Finschafen, Derna, Defence of Scarlet Beach, Defence of Tobruk, Siki Cove, Defence of Alamein Line, Gusika, Tell el Makh Khad, Borneo, Sanyet el Miteirya, Labuan, Quattara Track, Beaufort, El Alamein, South West Pacific 1941–1945, Greece 1941, Liberation of Australian New Guinea, Brallos Pass, Matapau, Middle East 1941–1944, Abau-Malin, Crete, Wewak, Retimo, Wirui Mission, Capture of Tobruk, Damour. (Note: Inherited from the 2/11th and 28th Battalions.)

== Alliances ==
- United Kingdom – The Rifles. (Note: Formerly the Royal Gloucestershire, Berkshire and Wiltshire Regiment, which is now the 1st Battalion, The Rifles.)

== Notes ==
Footnotes

Citations
