= Royal Western Australia Regiment =

Australian Army Reserve unit

The Royal Western Australia Regiment
- Cap badge of the Royal Western Australia Regiment
- Active: 1960–Present
- Type: Line infantry
- Role: Light role
- Size: Two battalions
- Part of: Royal Australian Infantry Corps
- Garrison/HQ: 11th/28th Battalion – Karrakatta; 16th Battalion – Karrakatta
- Motto: Vigilant
- March: 11th/28th Battalion – Sussex by the Sea/Colonel Bogey; 16th Battalion – March of the Cameron Men

Commanders
- Colonel of the Regiment: Chris Dawson (Governor of Western Australia)

Insignia
- Unit colour patch
- Tartan: Cameron of Erracht
- Abbreviation: RWAR

The Royal Western Australia Regiment is a reserve infantry regiment of the Australian Army consisting of two battalions, the 11th/28th Battalion and the 16th Battalion. The regiment was raised in July 1960 as part of the reorganisation of the Australian Army Reserve through the amalgamation of the three existing infantry regiments in Western Australia.

== History ==
In the late 1950s the decision was made to amalgamate the all the regiments in each state into one regiment, as a result, the three regiments in Western Australia were amalgamated to form the Western Australia Regiment in 1960. The regiments were:

- The City of Perth Regiment (11th Battalion)
- The Cameron Highlanders of Western Australia (16th Battalion)
- The Swan Regiment (28th Battalion)

The same year the Australian Army adopted Pentropic Organisation. The three battalions Initially formed as a single battalion, in 1966 it was reorganised into first two, then three battalions. Two of these, the 11th Battalion and 28th Battalion were reduced to single companies in 1977 being the 11th Independent and 28th Independent Rifle Companies, then amalgamated into the single 11th/28th Battalion in 1987.

The regiment perpetuates the traditions of three battalions of the Australian Imperial Force:

- 11th Battalion – the 11th Battalion was raised in 1903 when the Perth Rifle Volunteers was renamed as the 11th Australian Infantry Regiment. On the outbreak of the First World War, volunteers from the 11th Regiment were recruited into the 11th Battalion of the Australian Imperial Force. This unit saw action in the Middle East at Gallipoli and in France before the end of the war. For its service, the battalion was awarded a King's Colour. The battalion was amalgamated with the 16th Battalion for a time, named as the 11th/16th Battalion for three years, before regaining its former title for service during the Second World War. A second battalion, 2/11th Battalion, was raised for service overseas in 1939. This saw service in North Africa, Greece and Crete, where the majority of its men were captured following the Battle of Retimo Airfield. Reformed in Syria in 1941, the 2/11th Battalion moved to New Guinea in 1943. Both war raised battalions were disbanded in 1946.
- 16th Battalion – the 16th Battalion was originally raised in September 1914. It was landed at Gallipoli the following year, also seeing service in France. The battalion was disbanded at the end of the war, then becoming a Citizen Military Force unit. It amalgamated with the 11th Battalion in 1930. A new 16th Battalion was raised in 1936 as the Cameron Highlanders of Western Australia. This battalion saw service in Syria, New Guinea and Borneo before the end of the Second World War.
- 28th Battalion – the 28th Battalion was raised in 1915, and saw service in the Middle East and Western Front before being disbanded in 1919. The battalion was reformed from its militia unit for the Second World War, serving alongside the 11th Battalion in New Britain. The 2/28th Battalion saw service overseas in North Africa, the Middle East and New Guinea. It was disbanded in 1946.

== Battle honours ==
=== 11th/28th Battalion ===
- South Africa 1899–1902
- The Great War: Pozieres, Messines, Passchendaele, Mont St.Quentin, Landing at Anzac, Somme 1916–1918, Bullecourt, Ypres 1917, Amiens, Hindenburg Line
- World War II: Capture of Tobruk, Defence of Tobruk, El Alamein, Brallos Pass, Liberation of New Guinea, Kokoda Trail, Borneo, Damour, Lae-Nadzab, Labuan

=== 16th Battalion ===
- South Africa 1899–1902
- World War I: Somme 1916–1918, Pozieres, Bullecourt, Messines 1917, Ypres 1917, Polygon Wood, Passchandaele, Arras 1918, Hamel, Amiens, Albert 1918, Hindenburg Line, Epehy, France and Flanders 1916–1918, Anzac, Landing at Anzac, Defence of Anzac, Suvla, Sari Bair, Gallipoli 1915, Egypt 1915–1916
- World War II: North Africa 1941, Syria, Syrian Frontier, The Litani, Sidon, Wadi Zeini, Damour, South West Pacific 1942 – 1945, Kokoda Trail, Isurava, Eora Creek, Templetons Crossing, Efogi-Menari, Ioribaiwa, Buna-Gona, Gona, Liberation of Australian New Guinea, Ramu Valley, Shaggy Ridge, Borneo, Balikpapan, Waitavolo

== Alliances ==
- United Kingdom – The Highlanders
- United Kingdom – The Princess of Wales's Royal Regiment (Queen's and Royal Hampshires)
- United Kingdom – The Rifles

== Regimental march ==
Sussex by the Sea (1907) by English composer William Ward-Higgs was adopted as regimental march.

== See also ==
- Australian Army
- Australian Army Reserve
- List of Australian Army Regiments
