= 13th Combat Service Support Battalion =

Australian Army Reserve unit

- Active: March 1995 – present
- Country: Australia
- Branch: Army
- Type: Logistics and Health Support
- Size: Headquarters and four sub-units
- Part of: 13th Brigade
- Garrison/HQ: HQ at Irwin Barracks
- Motto(s): Soldiers Supporting Soldiers
- Mascot(s): Woylie

Commanders
- Commanding Officer: Lieutenant Colonel Shaun Fenn

13th Combat Service Support Battalion (13 CSSB) is a unit of the 13th Brigade of the Australian Army Reserve. Located in Western Australia, it is the logistics component of the 13th Brigade.

== History ==
The battalion was formed in March 1995 and was previously designated the 13th Brigade Administrative Support Battalion. On formation, it consisted of the following sub-units:

- 7th Field Ambulance
- 10th Transport Squadron
- 13th Field Supply Company
- 5th Dental Unit
- 113th Field Workshop Company

13 CSSB was granted "Freedom of Entry" to the City of Fremantle on 1 October 2001. Its motto is ″Soldiers Supporting Soldiers″.

== Role and composition ==
The role of 13 CSSB is to provide service and logistics support to the 13th Brigade and wider Australian Army. A Reserve unit, it is based at Irwin Barracks, and as of February 2020, 13 CSSB comprises a battalion headquarters and four sub-units:

- 7th Close Health Company
- 10th Transport Squadron
- 113th Workshop Company
- 13 CSSB Logistics Company
