= Australian Army Reserve =

Reserve units of the Australian Army

- Official names: Citizen Military Forces (CMF); (1901–1980); Militia (1929–1943); CMF (1943–1980); Army Reserve (1980–)
- Active: 1 March 1901 (as CMF)
- Country: Australia
- Type: Militia
- Size: 15,596 (Active Reserve)(2022); 12,496 (Standby Reserve)(2009)
- Part of: Australian Army
- Engagements: World War I World War II; East Timor; War in Afghanistan

Commanders
- Chief of Army: Lieutenant General Susan Coyle
- Commander 2nd Division: Major General Matt Burr

The Australian Army Reserve is a collective name given to the reserve units of the Australian Army. Since the Federation of Australia in 1901, the reserve military force has been known by many names, including the Citizens Forces, the Citizen Military Forces, the Militia and, unofficially, the Australian Military Forces. In 1980, however, the current name—Australian Army Reserve—was officially adopted, and it now consists of a number of components based around the level of commitment and training obligation that its members are required to meet.

== Overview ==
For the first half of the 20th century, due to a widespread distrust of permanent military forces in Australia, the reserve military forces were the primary focus of Australian military planning. Following the end of World War II, however, this focus gradually shifted due to the changing strategic environment, and the requirement for a higher readiness force available to support collective security goals. Since then, Australian defence policy has been focused more upon the Regular Army, and there has been considerable debate about the role of the Army Reserve within defence planning circles. As the strategic situation has evolved in the post Cold War era, the organisation, structure, training and role of the Army Reserve has undergone considerable changes, and members of the Army Reserve are increasingly being used on overseas deployments, not only within Regular Army units, but also in units drawn almost entirely from Reserve units.

Despite being the main focus upon which Australian defence planning was based, since Federation Reserve units have primarily been used in the role of home defence and to provide a mobilisation platform during times of war. During World War I Australia's contribution to the fighting came from forces raised outside the citizen forces that were in existence at the time, and although many citizen soldiers enlisted in these forces, the Citizen Forces units remained in Australia. With the outbreak of World War II a similar situation evolved, with the establishment of an all-volunteer expeditionary force, however, with the entry of Japan into the war the threat to Australia became more direct and a number of Militia units were called upon to fight in New Guinea and other areas of the South West Pacific.

Following the end of World War II, however, the decision was made to establish a permanent standing defence force and the role of Reserve forces was reduced to the point where for a while their relevance was called into question. Recently, however, there has been a move to develop a more capable Reserve force, as Australia's overseas military commitments in the Pacific and Middle East have highlighted the importance of the Reserves once more. As such, since 2000 units of the Australian Army Reserve have been deployed to East Timor and the Solomon Islands on peacekeeping duties and many more individual Reservists have been used to provide specialist capabilities and to fill in Regular Army formations being sent overseas.

== History ==
=== Federation to World War I ===
Following the Federation of Australia in 1901, the amalgamation of the military forces controlled by the six separate, self-governing British colonies to form a unified force controlled by the Commonwealth was an inevitable, albeit slowly realised, consequence, given that the new Constitution of Australia assigned primary responsibility for defence to the Commonwealth. Indeed, this process took some time as, to a large extent, matters of defence were not necessarily a priority of the new Australian legislature at the time, and there was also a considerable diversity in opinion regarding the composition and size of the new national army and role it would play at home and indeed within the wider Imperial defence system. Nevertheless, the official transfer of forces from the states to the Commonwealth occurred on 1 March 1901, and this date is today celebrated as the birthday of the modern Australian Army. At the outset, the bulk of the Commonwealth military force was to be made up of part-time volunteers. (Note: The military forces under Commonwealth control in 1901 were 28,886 men, of whom only 1,500 were permanent soldiers—mostly serving in the artillery and instructional corps.) This was arguably due to two factors. Firstly, there was a widespread desire amongst Australian policymakers to keep defence expenditure low, while secondly there was a widespread mistrust or suspicion surrounding the idea of a large standing army.

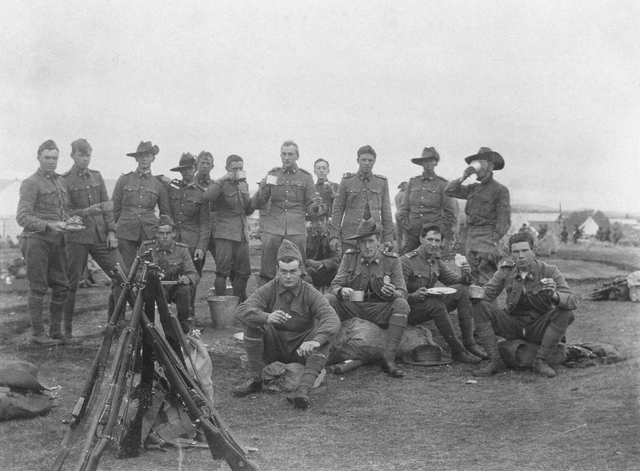
Members of the militia in Tasmania, c. 1913

After the initial transfer of forces in March 1901, further progress was slow as administrative and legislative instruments took time to develop. Indeed, it was not until 1 March 1904 that the Defence Act 1903 was proclaimed, providing the Commonwealth Military Forces a statutory framework within which they could operate. Amidst a background of political manoeuvring and personal agendas, the military forces were eventually reorganised into a more or less unified command structure. As a part of this, state-based mounted units were reformed into light horse regiments, supplemented by the transfer of men from a number of superfluous infantry units, while the remaining infantry were organised into battalions of the Australian Infantry Regiment and engineers and artillery were organised into field companies and garrison artillery batteries. Due to the provisions of the Defence Act which did not provide for the establishment of a regular infantry force, the notion that the Commonwealth Military Forces would be largely based on a part-time militia was set out in legislation.

The lack of importance placed on military matters in Australian political circles continued for some time, and the size of the Australian military in this time continued to fall, in part due to the emphasis placed upon mounted units in the new command structure. However, following a number of strategic and political "scares", (Note: For example the Japanese victory over the Russians in the Russo-Japanese War. Grey 2008, p. 77.) defence matters slowly began to take on more primacy in the Australian psyche before a review of defence needs was made in 1909 by Field Marshal Lord Kitchener. The result of this review was the realisation of the need to build a credible defence force that could not only defend the nation, but also possibly contribute to the Imperial defence system (although this later realisation remained little more than a consideration on paper only). The review also validated the compulsory military training scheme that was to be introduced in 1910, which was directly responsible for expanding the Citizen Forces by up to 50 percent in the three years prior to the outbreak of World War I. Separately then-Brigadier Kenneth Mackay CB VD was appointed to draw up plans for the Australian Army Reserve in 1915, and became its first director-general in 1916.

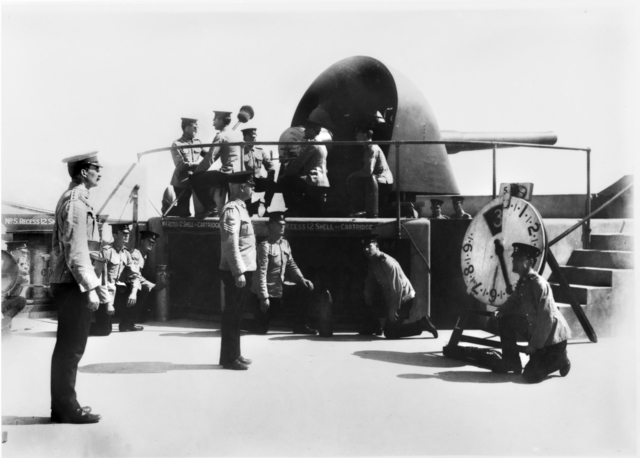
A six-inch gun at Fort Nepean in August 1914. This gun fired Australia's first shot of the war when the German merchant ship SS Pfalz attempted to escape from Port Phillip Bay on 5 August 1914.

Undoubtedly, the scheme proved to have numerous benefits, as many (Note: It is estimated that up to 15 percent of AIF recruits had gained prior military experience as a result of this scheme.) of these youths went on to serve in the First AIF during World War I and the expanded organisation allowed citizen forces officers more experience in commanding formed bodies of men. However, it was the main factor contributing to the decision to recruit the AIF on the basis of voluntary enlistment. Because the army in 1914 was largely made up of young men aged between 19 and 21 who had been enlisted under this scheme, and due to the provisions of the Defence Act that precluded sending conscripts overseas, upon the outbreak of the war it was necessary for the Australian government to raise a separate force, outside the Citizen Forces organisation for service overseas. Regardless, it has been estimated that up to 50,000 militiamen subsequently enlisted in the First AIF during the war.

During the precautionary stage on 2 August 1914, Citizen Forces units were called up to guard essential points and man coastal forts and harbour defences. The first Australian shots (many sources report the first Allied shots) of both World War I and World War II were fired by the garrison at Fort Nepean. By June 1918, 9,215 home service troops were on active duty in Australia, alongside 2,476 regular soldiers. From 1915, only skeleton garrisons were maintained at coastal forts, but the personnel manning them were forbidden to enlist in the AIF. This ban was lifted in April 1915 but the presence of a German commerce raider in Australian waters caused a mobilisation from February to April 1916, while another mobilisation occurred in April 1918 for the same reason. Just before the end of World War I, Australia's home forces were reorganised to perpetuate the numerical identities of the AIF units. This was done renumbering the infantry regiments that had been formed in 1912, and giving them the numbers of the AIF units that had been formed in their regimental areas. A total of 60 AIF infantry battalions had seen active service during the war, but there were more than 60 infantry regiments; as a result, a number of the Citizen Forces regiments were reorganised with multiple battalions, while other units were converted to pioneer regiments.

=== Post World War I ===
Following the end of World War I, the units that had been raised as part of the AIF were disbanded, and the focus of Australian defence planning returned once more to the maintenance of the Citizen Forces. To this end, a review of defence requirements in 1920 established the need for Australia to be able to field a force of approximately 270,000 men in the event of a war, of which half of this would be maintained in peacetime through compulsory enlistment, i.e. in essence a form of national service. It was also decided that the CMF would be re-organised along the lines of the AIF, adopting the divisional structure of the AIF units and maintaining their battle honours. The AIF officially ceased to exist on 1 April 1921 and the new organisation of the Citizen Forces was adopted a month later; this saw the reorganisation of the 88 infantry battalions and five pioneer regiments that had been established under the 1918 scheme, the abolition of infantry regiments and the re-establishment of the 60 infantry battalions that had existed within the AIF, as well as various other units, such as light horse regiments, as well.

There was little support for compulsory military service amongst the public, however, and combined with the financial pressure that the government felt at that time to reduce defence spending, the 1920 recommendations were not fully implemented. Although the compulsory training scheme was retained, it was decided that it would only be focused on the more populated areas, essentially ending the scheme in rural areas. The result of this was that the course of only a year the strength of the Citizen Forces fell from 127,000 to only 37,000 in 1922. Throughout the 1920s, numbers decreased even further and although the divisional structure was maintained, it was little more than a skeleton force as units found their numbers dropping drastically.

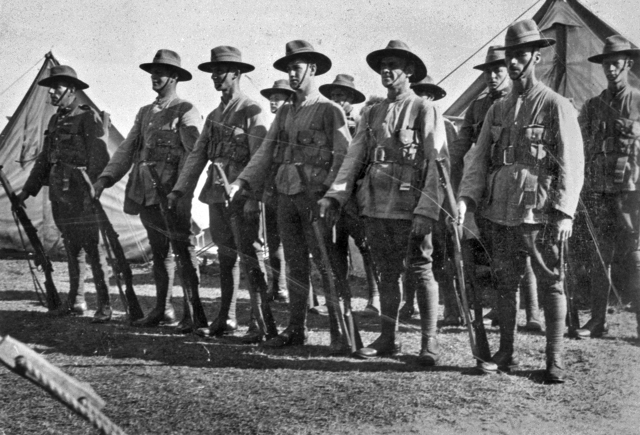
Soldiers of the CMF 56th Battalion in 1937

In 1929, following the election of the Scullin Labor government, the compulsory training scheme was abolished and in its place a new system was introduced whereby the CMF would be maintained on a part-time, voluntary basis only. At this time it was also decided to change the name of the force to the Militia, as it was felt that the latter name implied voluntary service (rather than compulsory national service). The force would be based upon the five divisions of the old AIF, although it was decided to limit the overall number of units. This force would also be armed with modern weapons and equipment. That, at least, was the promise, however, in reality this never came to fruition and to a large extent they continued to be trained and equipped with 1914–18 equipment right up to and during World War II. The result of this change in recruitment policy was a huge drop in the size of the Army, as numbers fell by almost 20,000 in one year as there was little prospect for training and as the financial difficulties of the Great Depression began to be felt. As a result, in 1930 the decision was made to disband or amalgamate a number of units and five infantry battalions and two light horse regiments were removed from the order of battle. The following year, nine more infantry battalions were disbanded.

Between 1929 and 1937, the number of soldiers within the Militia who could provide effective service was well below the force's actual on paper strength as many soldiers were unable to attend even a six-day annual camp out of fear of losing their civilian employment. Also, it has been estimated that up to 50 per cent of the Militia's other ranks were medically unfit. The numbers situation had become so tenuous that it was rare for a battalion to be able to field even 100 men during an exercise, so units accepted men that would not normally meet the medical requirements, indeed it has been stated that men who were "lame and practically blind" were allowed to join in an effort to improve numbers. To illustrate this, in 1936, the largest battalion—the 30th/51st Battalion—had just 412 personnel of all ranks, while the 11th/16th Battalion, which was the smallest, had only 156 men.

Financially the Militia was neglected also. Despite the upturn in the economic situation in the early 1930s there was little financial respite for the Militia in this time. As the situation continued to improve, however, the defence vote was increased steadily after 1935. Indeed, in 1938 the government decided to double the strength of the Militia as war clouds began to loom on the horizon, and late in the year a recruiting campaign was launched that saw the size of the Militia increase from 35,000 to 43,000 men over the space of three months. This trend continued into 1939 and by midway through the year there were over 80,000 men serving on a part-time voluntary basis. Nevertheless, there was a serious shortage of equipment and as a result, when World War II broke out in September 1939 the Militia was by no means an effective fighting force and the nation as a whole was not as well prepared for war as it had been in 1914.

=== World War II ===
Following the outbreak of the war in Europe, the government's immediate response was to announce on 5 September 1939 that it would begin calling up 10,000 militiamen at a time to provide sixteen days continuous service manning guard posts at selected points around the country. This was later expanded on 15 September to include all of the Militia, in two drafts of 40,000 men, for one month's continuous training, however, the suspension on compulsory training introduced in 1929 was not amended until January 1940. On 5 September 1939 it was also announced that a division would be raised for overseas service, but there was still large-scale opposition to the concept of conscription and the provisions of the Defence Act still precluded conscripts from serving outside Australian territory, so it was announced that this force would be raised from volunteers only and would not be raised directly from the Militia. Conscripts, however, were required to serve in the Militia, with the result being that the Militia's ranks were filled with both volunteers and conscripts during this time.

As was the case during World War I, many members of the Militia would go on to serve in the Second AIF. Nevertheless, for a period of time the government attempted to limit the number of militiamen transferring across to the AIF to build defences at home against concerns that Britain might not be able to fulfil its pledge to defend Singapore in the event of an attack there by the Japanese. As such, once again Australia maintained a policy of two armies. For the first two years Australia's involvement in the war was focused in overseas theatres in Europe, the Middle East and North Africa, and during this time it was the AIF that was involved in the fighting overseas, while units of the Militia were used in garrison duties in Australia and New Guinea, then occupied by Australia. During this time, the Militia units came to be derided by the men of the AIF units, with militiamen sometimes being labelled as "chocolate soldiers" or "koalas". (Note: The reference to "chocolate soldiers" relates to the widely held belief that the militiamen would melt the first time they were required for action, while the jibe about "koalas" is taken from the fact that at the time koalas were protected under law, in so much as it was illegal for them to be shot or exported.)

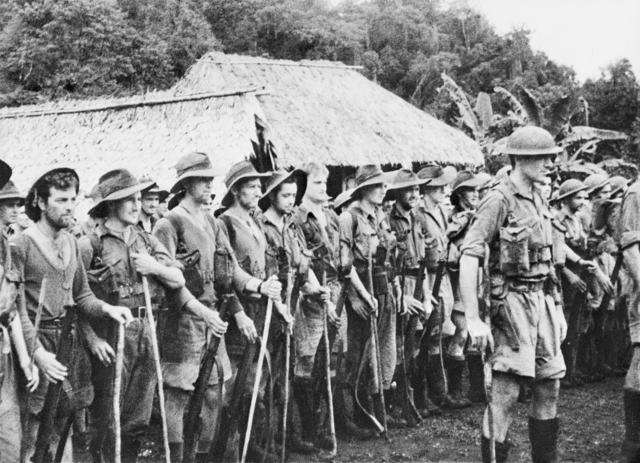
Militia soldiers of the 39th Battalion following their relief at Kokoda in September 1942

This changed dramatically, however, following the entry of Japan into the war on 8 December 1941, with the attack on Pearl Harbor and on the British forces in Malaya. Suddenly the war was brought much closer to Australia's borders, and there was a perception that Japan might attempt to invade the Australian mainland. In April 1942, following the loss of Malaya and Singapore and the subsequent Japanese landings in New Guinea, the possibility of invasion appeared much more real. Seeing the threat that the Japanese posed to British and Australian interests in the region, the government had begun to bring AIF units back from the Middle East. Nonetheless, the bulk of the forces immediately available for the defence of Australia came from the militia, which was at that stage an organisation of some 265,000 men organised into five infantry and two cavalry divisions.

Despite earlier derision, a number of Militia units went on to perform with distinction during the Pacific War, especially in 1942, when they fought Japanese forces in New Guinea. As the situation in the Pacific worsened in July 1942 and the Japanese drove towards Port Moresby, members of the Militia found themselves on the front lines. As reinforcements were brought up from Australia, the Militia units that had been sent to New Guinea as garrison troops earlier in the war were called upon to fight a stubborn rearguard action on the Kokoda Track to delay the Japanese advance long enough for these reinforcements to arrive. At the same time, the Militia battalions of the 7th Brigade played a key role in the Battle of Milne Bay, when Australian and United States forces defeated the Japanese in a large-scale battle for the first time during the war.

After 1940, use of the term "Militia" to describe the part-time military forces waned and by 1942 the term "Citizen Military Forces" (CMF) had become more common. Later in the war, the Defence (Citizen Military Forces) Act 1943, officially referring to the organisation as the CMF, was passed to change the law to allow the transfer of Militia or CMF units to the AIF, if 65 percent or more of their personnel had volunteered for overseas service. Additionally, changes to the Act meant that Militia units were able to serve anywhere south of the Equator in the South West Pacific Area (SWPA), excluding western Java and northern Borneo, and as a result of this, Militia units saw action against Japanese forces in the Dutch East Indies, at Merauke, later in the war. Despite these changes, the AIF remained the Australian Army's main combat force during the war and indeed more than 200,000 members of the Militia transferred to the AIF throughout the course of the conflict. Nevertheless, 32 Militia infantry battalions, later organised into three Militia divisions (3rd, 5th and 11th), saw service over much of the South West Pacific and participated in the following campaigns: Salamaua-Lae, Huon Peninsula, Finisterre Range, New Britain and Bougainville.

=== Post World War II to the Vietnam War ===
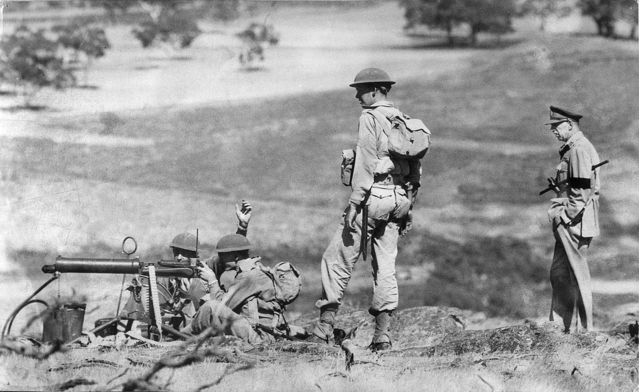
A CMF machine gun team during an exercise in 1952

Due to an overcommitment of resources early in the war, the Australian economy suffered badly from manpower shortages as early as 1942. As a result, the government began the demobilisation process before the war was over and, when it had finally come to an end, the government was very keen for the demobilisation process to be completed as quickly as possible. Defence issues were not given a high priority as people tried to rebuild their lives after the war and as such it was not until 1948 that the CMF was reformed.

Subsequent reviews of defence policy and the strategic situation in South East Asia after the war had resulted in the formation of the Australian Regiment in 1948, the first regular infantry unit of the Australian Army. (Note: The Australian Regiment later gained the Royal cipher, thus becoming the Royal Australian Regiment.) From that time on as tension within the region increased the strength of the Regular Army increased rapidly in contrast to the CMF, signifying if not an end to Australian military planners' reliance upon citizen soldiers, at least a shift in focus and a realisation of the mistakes that had been made prior to World War II. This would see the CMF providing a platform upon which the Army could mobilise in the event of a war. Initially, the plan had been for the CMF to be made up of 50,000 men organised into two divisions and other units, however, recruitment was unable to meet these targets as initially it was attempted to achieve this through voluntary enlistment. Indeed, in its first year of existence, the actual strength of the CMF was only 8,698 personnel, although this rose the following year to 16,202 and to 32,779 in 1950. In March 1951, a system of compulsory national service was re-established.

The reintroduction of this conscription scheme saw the numbers of the CMF rise substantially but its management and administration required the allocation of a large number of resources and personnel from the Regular Army at a time when the army Regular Army already heavily committed in Korea and Malaya and so the scheme was suspended in 1959. This was a significant blow to the CMF and its strength fell by more than half in that year to 20,000 men. Further changes came with the introduction of the pentropic (five battle group) division into the Australian Army in 1960. This proved a disaster for the CMF, as wholesale changes were made and units removed from the order of battle. Seven artillery regiments were disbanded from an original total of 17, while 31 infantry battalions were reduced to 17. This excluded the University Regiments and the Papua New Guinea Volunteer Rifles which remained unchanged. The remaining battalions were later merged into just nine battalions. Meanwhile, the CMF armoured units had already been rationalised in 1957 and as a result the change to the pentropic structure mostly resulted in a change in role only, such as the 4th/19th Prince of Wales's Light Horse, which changed from an armoured unit to a reconnaissance regiment. The two CMF armoured brigade headquarters were also disbanded.

Redesignation of CMF battalions as pentropic companies (as at 1 July 1960)
Pentropic battalion	CMF source battalion	Pentropic rifle company
1st Battalion, Royal Queensland Regiment	9th Battalion (The Moreton Regiment); 25th Battalion (The Darling Downs Regiment} 47th Battalion (The Wide Bay Regiment); 41st Battalion (The Byron Scottish Regiment)	A Company: The Moreton Company; B Company: The Darling Downs Company; C Company: Not Used; D Company: The Wide Bay Company; E Company: The Byron Scottish Company
2nd Battalion, Royal Queensland Regiment	51st Battalion (The Far North Queensland Regiment); 31st Battalion (The Kennedy Regiment); 42nd Battalion (The Capricornia Regiment)	A and B Companies: The Far North Queensland Company; C Company: The Kennedy Company; D and E Companies: The Capricornia Company
2nd Battalion, Royal New South Wales Regiment	30th Battalion (The New South Wales Scottish Regiment); 17th/18th Battalion (The North Shore Regiment); 2nd Battalion (The City of Newcastle Regiment); 13th Battalion (The Macquarie Regiment); 6th Battalion (New South Wales Mounted Rifles)	A Company: The New South Wales Scottish Company; B Company: The North Shore Regiment; C Company: The City of Newcastle Company; D Company: The Macquarie Company; E Company: The Rifles Company; Support Company: The Kuring Gai Company
3rd Battalion, Royal New South Wales Regiment	45th Battalion (The St George Regiment); 34th Battalion (The Illawarra Regiment); 3rd Battalion (The Werriwa Regiment); 4th Battalion (The Australian Rifles)	A Company: The St George Company; B Company: The Illawarra Company; C Company: The Werriwa Company; D Company: The Australian Rifles Company; E Company: The Riverina Company; Support Company: The St George Company
1st Battalion, Royal Victoria Regiment	5th Battalion (The Victorian Scottish Regiment); 6th Battalion (The Royal Melbourne Regiment); 58th/32nd Battalion (The City of Essendon Regiment	A Company: The Scottish Company; B Company: The Merri Company; C Company: The Melbourne Company; D Company: The Essendon Company; E Company: The Footscray Company
2nd Battalion, Royal Victoria Regiment	8th/7th Battalion (The North Western Victorian Regiment); 38th Battalion (The Northern Victorian Regiment); 59th Battalion (The Hume Regiment)	A Company: The Geelong Company; The Ballarat Company; C Company: The Sunraysia Company; D Company: The Bendigo Company; E Company The Goulburn Valley Company
1st Battalion, Royal Tasmania Regiment	12th Battalion (The Launceston Regiment); 40th Battalion (The Derwent Regiment)	A Company: The Launceston Company; B Company: The Derwent Company
1st Battalion, Royal South Australia Regiment	27th Battalion (The South Australian Scottish Regiment); 43rd/48th Battalion (The Hindmarsh Regiment); 10th Battalion (The Adelaide Rifles)	A Company: The South-East Company; B Company: The River Company; C Company: The Mid-North Company; D Company: The Adelaide Company; E Company: The Port Adelaide Company
1st Battalion, Royal Western Australia Regiment	11th/44th Battalion (The City of Perth Regiment); 16th Battalion (The Cameron Highlanders of Western Australia); 28th Battalion (The Swan Regiment)	A Company: The City of Perth Company; B Company: The Cameron Company; C Company: The Swan Company; D Company: The West Australian Rifles Company; E Company: The North Coast Company
Source: Palazzo 2001, p. 259

At the same time, it was decided to amalgamate old local and regional regiments that had existed into six new multi-battalion state-based regiments. While the pentropic system eventually fell by the wayside, these regiments have endured, maintaining the battle honours of the previously existing Militia units that had perpetuated the units of the AIF and serving as a valuable link to the traditions and service of earlier units. Nevertheless, many CMF soldiers felt that the introduction of these regiments reduced the Army's links to the community due to the move away from the traditional regionally based system and as a result many of these soldiers chose to leave the organisation. In 1965, as the pentropic system was abandoned, a further re-organisation of the CMF was undertaken as existing battalions were reduced and additional battalions were raised in the more populous areas, namely in Queensland, Victoria and New South Wales. Concerns about the regional identity of these units were addressed by reintroducing the old numerical designations. In 1966, the Army authorised the raising of six remote area battalions, one in each state. These units offered special conditions of service for men who could not meet their training requirements through normal attendance due to their occupation or place of residence. Ultimately though the Tasmanian battalion was never formed.

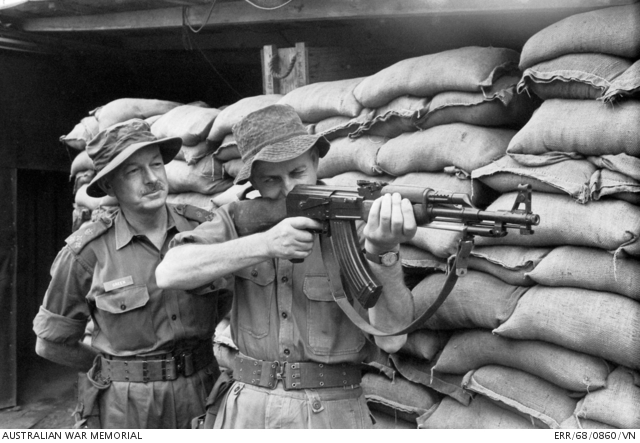
Two CMF Brigadiers examine a captured Type 56 assault rifle at Nui Dat.

The subordinate relationship between the CMF and Regular Army was further underlined when the national service scheme was re-introduced in 1965, albeit in the guise of a selective ballot. Whereas previous incarnations of the system had not allowed for national servicemen to be sent overseas (within various definitions of that term), the new scheme was implemented with the express purpose of sending these recruits overseas as Australia's commitments in the region required a large-scale increase in the Army. Additionally, instead of being used to fill the ranks of the CMF, the scheme was essentially used to expand the Regular Army. Due to the terms of service, national servicemen were required to serve two years full-time in Regular Army units, after which they were required to serve a further three years in the CMF. Despite this, however, potential conscripts were given the option to voluntarily enlist in the CMF prior to their date of birth being announced, thus exempting them from being drafted for overseas service. Due to the desire of many to avoid being sent overseas, as a result of this option, it was estimated that by 1968 almost half of the 35,000 men in the CMF had joined to avoid being drafted.

This led to a widespread public perception that the CMF was a refuge for "draft dodgers", and to the creation of an organisation in which the majority of its members had little or no motivation to fulfil their training obligations. Although this was not a universal experience, overall it affected the morale of the CMF and, coupled with the decision by the government not to activate CMF units for service in Vietnam, this led to a decline in genuine voluntary enlistment. To a large extent also, the government's decision to not use the CMF during this time highlighted the organisation's increasing structural irrelevance, and questions about the role that the CMF had to play in the defence of Australia would remain until following the end of the Vietnam War. Meanwhile, the last CMF armoured regiment gave up its tanks in 1971.

=== Post Vietnam War to the new millennium ===
When the Whitlam government came to power in late 1972, the CMF was in a very poor state. The new government moved quickly to end conscription, and this caused the CMF's strength to fall by roughly 5,000 to 23,119 by June 1973. In 1973 a committee of inquiry into the CMF was announced, under the chairmanship of Dr. T.B Millar and the subsequent report developed from this inquiry became known as the Millar Report. Far from being a vehicle of the Regular Army to denigrate the CMF as some opponents predicted, the report did much to highlight many of the conceptual and structural problems that the CMF was afflicted by at the time, however, the way in which the government chose to implement the recommendations, and indeed the way in which some of them were allowed to lapse, ultimately served to at least partially justify some of the cynicism voiced in certain CMF circles about the report.

The committee found that the CMF was a hollow shell of its former self, depleted in numbers and in equipment and unable to adequately fulfil its tasks. However, it still found that there was a role for the CMF to play in the strategic environment that existed at the time, although it would no longer be called upon to provide the base upon which mobilisation in a time of war would be built, instead it would be used to augment the Regular Army. This was the first step in creating the concept of a total force, in which the differing virtues of the citizen soldier and the regular soldier would be used to complement each other, and in this vein the Millar Report recommended that the name be changed from the CMF to the Australian Army Reserve.

Nevertheless, due to further cuts in defence spending and an eagerness of the government to implement those recommendations that could assist in achieving this goal, units that were unable to meet attendance requirements were disbanded or amalgamated with others, thus further diffusing the community links units had established in their local areas and thus further impacting upon recruitment and retention. Further, the decision was made to abolish the old CMF divisions, as the role of the Army Reserve would no longer be to act as a skeleton force that would be filled out upon mobilisation, but rather a force that could provide individual sub-units of capability should the need arise to augment the Regular Army. Centralisation of training was also a result of the Millar Report; beforehand, recruit training had been an ad hoc process managed mainly by the units themselves. Other issues such as pay and conditions of service, protection of civilian employment and recruitment and retention were touched upon but remained largely unaddressed until more recently.

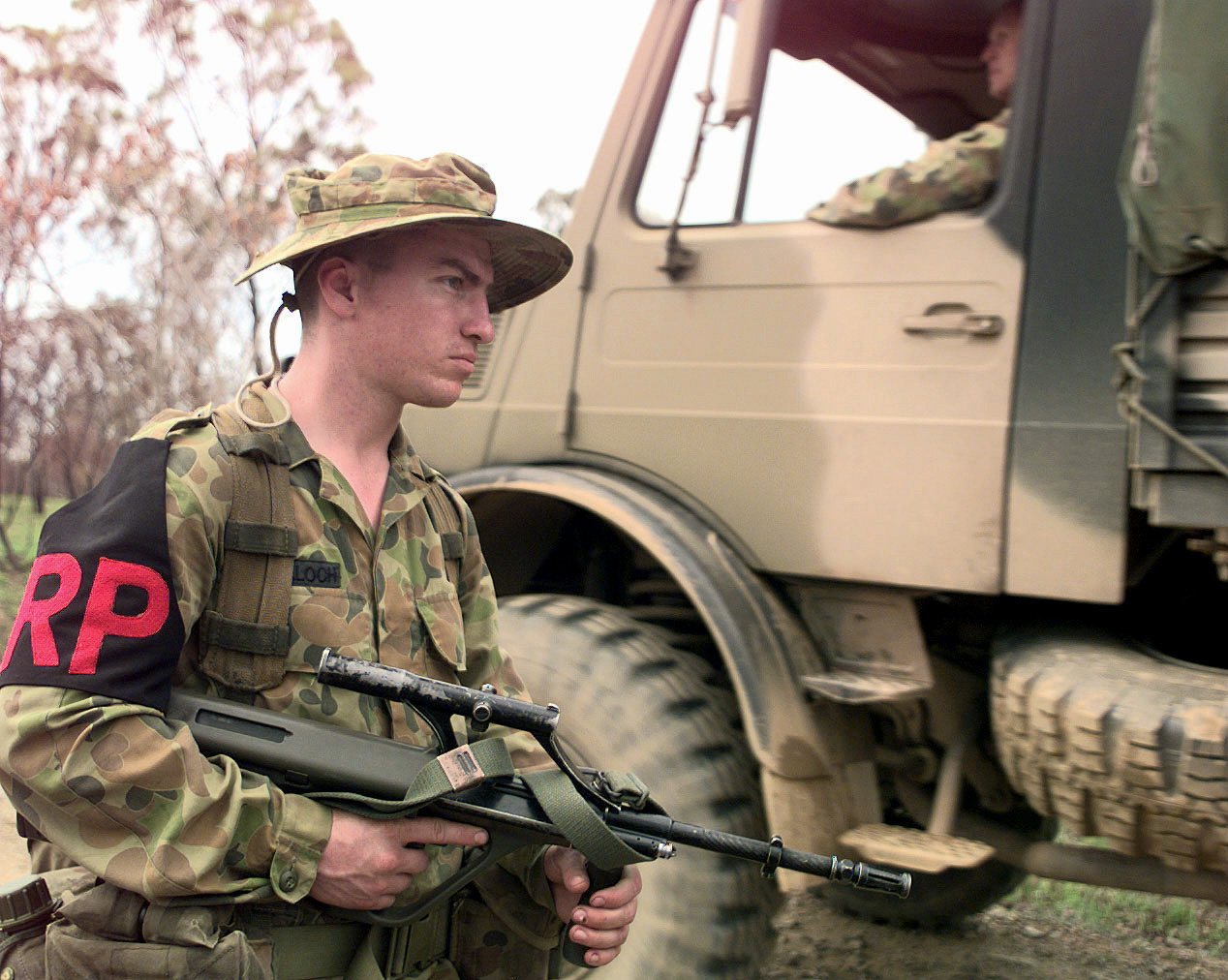
A member of the 9th Battalion, Royal Queensland Regiment during an exercise in 1999

Further reviews came in this time as Defence planners attempted to grapple with the questions regarding strategy following the wars of diplomacy of the previous three decades. The emergence of the Defence of Australia doctrine as the foundation upon which Australian defence policy would be based following Paul Dibb's 1986 review of Australia's defence capabilities seemed to provide the Reserves with a definite role. Nevertheless, there remained a reluctance to rebuild the Reserves and despite these major reviews, as late as the 1990s the Army still had not managed to develop a well-structured reserve force, as it had continued to grapple with the competing demands of maintaining large-scale general readiness over developing a 'hard core' of capability within the Reserves that would be able to provide the Army with a nucleus force in times of national emergency.

In 1991, in an attempt to rectify this, the Ready Reserve scheme was established. Under this scheme the 6th Brigade, an existing Regular brigade based in Brisbane at the time, was converted to a Ready Reserve formation. The majority of the personnel were Reservists who undertook a period of twelve months full-time service before returning to normal Reserve status for a further four years. The scheme showed considerable promise. Nevertheless, due to cost constraints it was abolished in 1996 by the newly elected Howard government.

By the time that the opening phases of the East Timor operation began in 1999, the issue regarding the purpose of the Army Reserve still had not been resolved. Instead of being able to provide formed units to augment the Regular Army, the Reserves was reduced to providing individuals for round-out purposes only. As a result, in the initial phase of the operation there were only 100 Reservists available to fill positions in INTERFET, mostly in specialist roles that the Regular Army had trouble providing. As the deployment progressed to a second rotation in April 2000, however, a further 630 Reservists volunteered for full-time service.

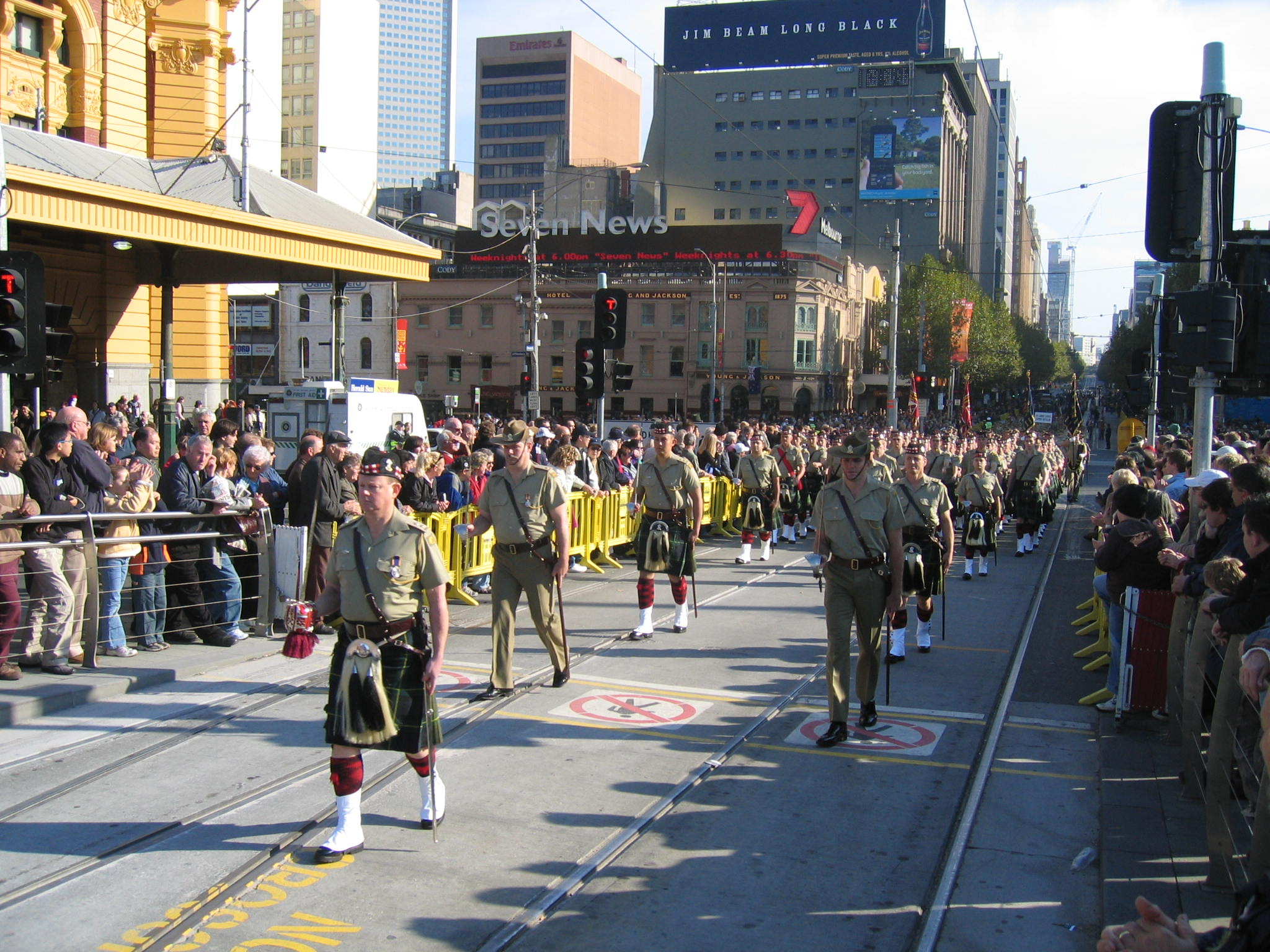
Members of the 5th/6th Battalion, Royal Victoria Regiment marching on ANZAC day 2006

The deployment to East Timor highlighted the limits of the Australian Defence Force and the need for an Army Reserve that could effectively provide deployable capabilities and individuals to round-out to the Regular Army in times of heavy operational commitment. As such, in late 2000 the government did what many governments had toyed with since the formation of the citizen force almost a hundred years earlier: enacting legislation that enabled the call-up of Reservists to full-time service in circumstances that fell short of a full scale defence emergency, thereby allowing their deployment overseas, while also protecting their employment and providing remuneration to employers. (Note: For example the Defence Reserve Service (Protection) Act 2001.)

The continuing high operational tempo of the Army after East Timor further emphasised the need to develop the capability of the Army Reserve. Since then increasing numbers of Reservists have been deployed overseas in varying capacities as well as undertaking periods of full-time service in Australia to maintain capabilities within Regular units heavily committed to deployments to Iraq, Afghanistan, East Timor and the Solomon Islands. In lower intensity areas, such as East Timor and the Solomon Islands, formed units of Reservists raised from personnel drawn from many units, have been deployed on peacekeeping duties to relieve the pressure being placed upon the Regular Army and allowing them to focus on the higher intensity combat zones in Iraq and Afghanistan. (Note: During the second rotation to East Timor, a company of Reservists was deployed based upon the 5th/6th, and 8th/7th Battalions of the Royal Victoria Regiment and 2nd/17th Battalion, Royal New South Wales Regiment. Additionally, a company battlegroup formed almost entirely of Reserve personnel was deployed to the Solomon Islands with relative frequency as part of the Regional Assistance Mission to Solomon Islands (RAMSI).) (Note: Out of a total of 7,270 Australian personnel deployed to the Solomon Islands between 2003 and 2013, some 2,122 were reserve personnel.) In addition to this Australian Army Reserve units have been deployed on border security duties with the Royal Australian Navy as part of Operation Relex, as well as participating regularly in multinational exercises such as Rifle Company Butterworth.

As such, the role of the Army Reserve now encompasses the '3 Rs'—that is reinforcement, round-out and rotation. With a total strength in 2005–06 of just 15,579 active personnel, recruitment and retention remain an ongoing issue for Defence planners, nevertheless Reservists continue to have a high training obligation. (Note: The general obligation of a Reservist is four nights and one weekend a month, as well as an annual two-week training exercise. Outside this there are periods of continuous training, such as basic and initial employment training that are required to be undertaken in the first two to three years of service.) Since September 2006, in an incentive to rectify sliding retention rates, Reservist salaries have been streamlined with those of regular forces as a reflection of overall higher standard of training. This initiative shows that in recent decades, there are now many positions for which there is little training gap at all between Reservists and Permanent Force members. In 2008–09 total strength included 17,064 active personnel. In addition there were another 12,496 members of the Standby Reserve.

In late 2008 a company from the 1st Commando Regiment became the first formed Army Reserve unit to see combat since World War II when it was deployed to Afghanistan as part of the Australian Special Operations Task Group. The initial deployment proved problematic however, with a subsequent inquiry finding that the company had received less support for its pre-deployment preparations than was typical for regular units and that its training was inadequate. The 1st Commando Regiment contributed forces to several other Special Operations Task Group rotations.

Between 2004 and 2017 a total of approximately 2,400 Army Reserve personnel have deployed on operations.

=== Plan Beersheba reforms ===
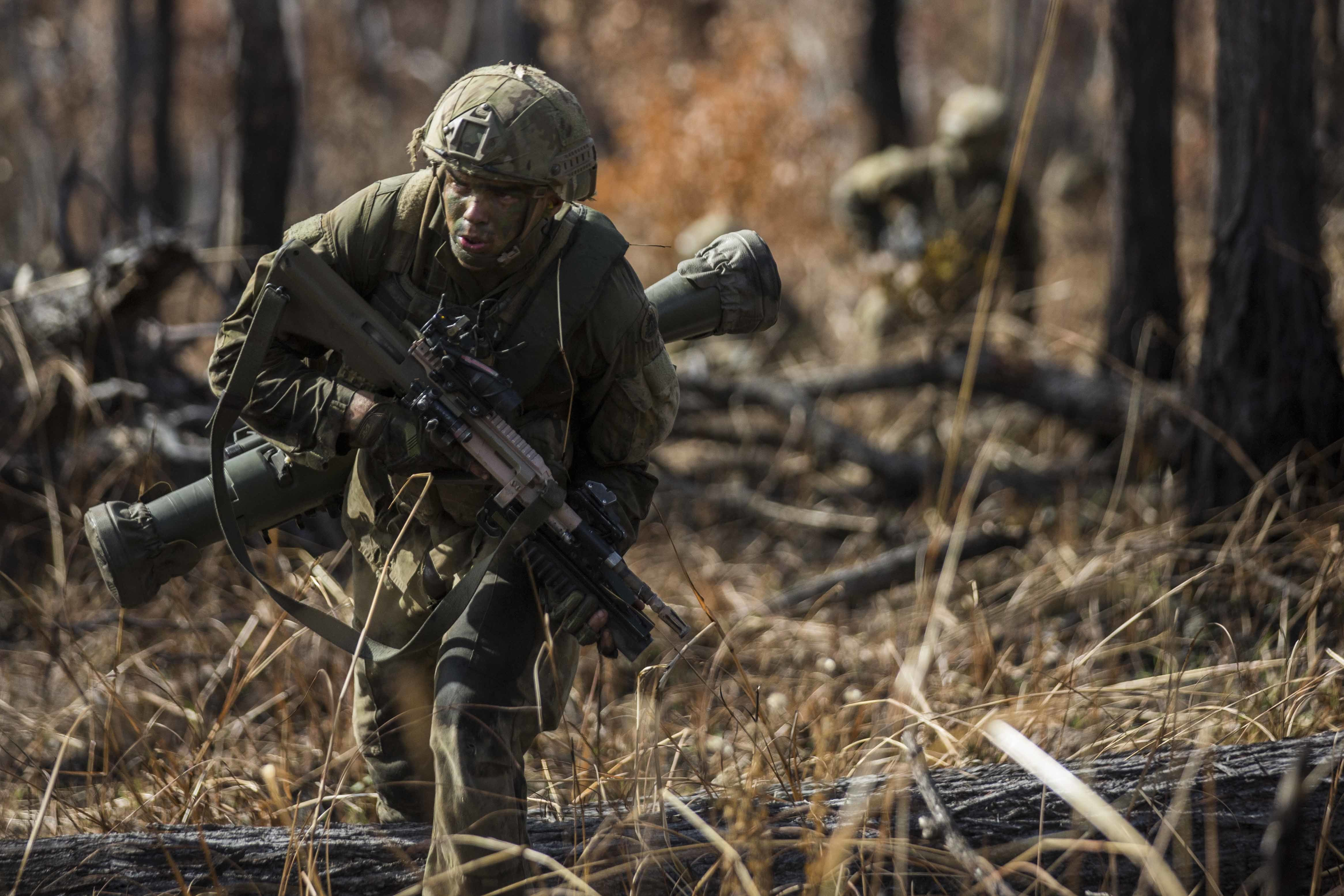
An 8th Brigade soldier during an exercise in 2016 in which the brigade formed Battle Group Waratah to operate alongside the regular 7th Brigade; such a pairing is a key feature of the Plan Beersheba reforms

In 2011, the Army Reserve's role and structure began being reformed under the Plan Beersheba reorganisation of the Army. The Army has stated that the reserves' role will become "to deliver specified capability and support and sustain Australian Defence Force (ADF) preparedness and operations".

As part of this reform, the six Army Reserve brigades are being paired with the regular brigades. The 4th and 9th Brigades will partner with the 1st Brigade, the 5th and 8th Brigades with the 7th Brigade, and the 11th and 13th Brigades with the 3rd Brigade. The pairs of Army Reserve brigades will be expected to be able to provide a battalion-sized force upon mobilisation during the regular brigade's 12 month 'ready' phase.

The structure of the reserve brigades is also being altered. The reserve artillery regiments will be re-equipped with mortars; the reserve Royal Australian Armoured Corps units will convert from light cavalry to producing crews for Bushmaster Protected Mobility Vehicles, and a brigade operational supply company will be established within each of the combat services support battalions.

== Current structure ==
=== Components ===
The Australian Army Reserve currently consists of the following components:

- Standby Reserve
- Active Reserve

These components are basically categories of service, which are determined by the level of training obligation and commitment that a member is required to meet. (Note: Within the Active Reserve there are two categories of service—the High Readiness Reserve and the Reserve Response Force. The Reserve Response Force are required to serve a minimum of 20 days and may serve a maximum 100, although a further 50 days may be undertaken upon special approval. Those that serve in the High Readiness Reserve have a higher minimum requirement, being required to serve at least 32 days. The Standby Reserve has no training obligation and is mainly used to maintain the administration of members upon discharge from the Regular Army or the Active Reserve in case they are required to be called back into service in a time of national emergency. Members of the Regular Army are required to remain in the Standby Reserve for five years following discharge.)

=== 2nd Division ===
The majority of Australian Army Reserve units are under the command of the 2nd Division in six state-based brigades. There are also many Reservists serving on full-time service within Regular Army units, performing the same roles and under the same pay and conditions as Regular soldiers. 2nd Division is currently made up of the following units:

- Headquarters, 2nd Division (Randwick Barracks, NSW)
- 8th Signal Regiment (HQ at Randwick Barracks, NSW)
  - 141st Signal Squadron (Gallipoli Barracks in Brisbane and Lavarack Barracks in Townsville)
  - 142nd Signal Squadron (Holsworthy Barracks in Liverpool)
  - 143rd Signal Squadron (HMAS Harman in Canberra)
  - 144th Signal Squadron (Keswick Barracks in Adelaide and Derwent Barracks in Hobart)
  - 108th Signal Squadron (Simpson Barracks in Melbourne)
  - 109th Signals Squadron (Irwin Barracks in Perth)
  - Operational Support Squadron (Randwick Barracks in Sydney)
- 8th Operational Support Unit
- 9th Regiment, Royal Australian Artillery, (HQ at Kogarah Barracks, NSW)
  - 2nd/10th Light Battery (HQ in Melbourne, Vic)
  - 3rd Light Battery (HQ at Irwin Barracks, WA)
  - 5th/11th Light Battery (HQ at Lavarack Barracks, Qld)
  - 6th/13th Light Battery (HQ at Keswick Barracks, SA)
  - 7th Light Battery (HQ in Dee Why, NSW)
  - 23rd Light Battery (HQ at Kogarah Barracks, NSW)
- Regional Force Surveillance Group
  - 51st Battalion, Far North Queensland Regiment (HQ at Cairns, Queensland)
  - North-West Mobile Force (HQ at Larrakeyah Barracks, NT)
  - Pilbara Regiment (HQ at Taylor Barracks, WA)
- 4th Brigade – Victoria and Tasmania
  - Headquarters 4th Brigade
  - 4th/19th Prince of Wales's Light Horse, Royal Australian Armoured Corps
  - 5th/6th Battalion, Royal Victoria Regiment
  - 8th/7th Battalion, Royal Victoria Regiment
  - 12th/40th Battalion, Royal Tasmanian Regiment
  - 22nd Engineer Regiment
  - 4th Combat Service Support Battalion
- 5th Brigade – New South Wales
  - Headquarters 5th Brigade
  - 1st/15th Royal New South Wales Lancers
  - 1st/19th Battalion, Royal New South Wales Regiment
  - 2nd/17th Battalion, Royal New South Wales Regiment
  - 4th/3rd Battalion, Royal New South Wales Regiment
  - 41st Battalion, Royal New South Wales Regiment
  - 5th Engineer Regiment
  - 5th Combat Service Support Battalion
- 8th Brigade – Training
  - Headquarters 8th Brigade
  - Melbourne University Regiment
  - Sydney University Regiment
  - Adelaide Universities Regiment
  - University of New South Wales Regiment
  - Queensland University Regiment
  - Western Australia University Regiment
- 9th Brigade – South Australia
  - Headquarters 9th Brigade
  - 3rd/9th Light Horse (South Australian Mounted Rifles)
  - 10th/27th Battalion, Royal South Australia Regiment
  - 3rd Field Squadron, Royal Australian Engineers
  - 9th Combat Service Support Battalion
- 11th Brigade – Queensland
  - Headquarters 11th Brigade
  - 9th Battalion, Royal Queensland Regiment
  - 25th/49th Battalion, Royal Queensland Regiment
  - 31st/42nd Battalion, Royal Queensland Regiment
  - 11th Engineer Regiment
  - 11th Combat Services Support Battalion
  - 12th/16th Hunter River Lancers
- 13th Brigade – Western Australia
  - Headquarters 13th Brigade
  - 10th Light Horse Regiment
  - 11th/28th Battalion, Royal Western Australia Regiment
  - 16th Battalion, Royal Western Australia Regiment
  - 13th Engineer Regiment
  - 13th Combat Service Support Battalion

=== Other Reserve units ===
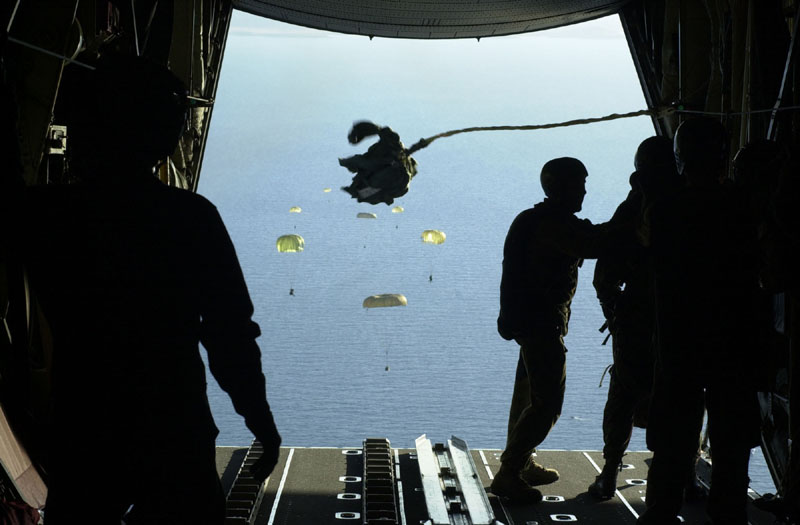
Commandos from 1st Commando Company parachute with inflatable boats from an RAAF C-130H into Shoalwater Bay during an exercise in 2001

The following units are reserve units within integrated (mixed regular army and reserve) formations:

- 6th Brigade
  - C Company, 1st Military Police Battalion
- 17th Sustainment Brigade
- 2nd Brigade
  - 3rd Health Battalion (HQ at Keswick Barracks, SA)
- Special Operations Command
  - 1st Commando Regiment (HQ at Randwick Barracks, NSW)

== Bibliography ==
- "Exciting Times Ahead for Our Army". Army: The Soldiers' Newspaper (1398 ed.). Canberra: Department of Defence. 15 June 2017. p. 10. ISSN 0729-5685.
- 13th Brigade. "13 Brigade Briefing Document". Australian Army. Archived from the original on 20 October 2009.
- Australian Army (2008). "Adaptive Army Public Info Paper" (PDF). Canberra: Australian Army. Archived from the original (PDF) on 22 April 2011.
- Australian Department of Defence (2009). Defence Annual Report 2008–09. Canberra: Defence Publishing Service. ISBN 978-0-642-29714-3.
- Australian National Audit Office (2009). Army Reserve Forces (PDF). Audit Report No.31 2008–09. Canberra: Australian National Audit Office. ISBN 978-0-642-81063-2. Archived from the original (PDF) on 15 May 2009.
- Davies, Andrew; Smith, Hugh (2008). Stepping Up: Part-time Forces and ADF Capability. Strategic Insights. Vol. 44. Canberra: Australian Strategic Policy Institute. OCLC 298987247.
- Festberg, Alfred (1972). The Lineage of the Australian Army. Melbourne, Victoria: Allara Publishing. ISBN 978-0-85887-024-6.
- Grey, Jeffrey (2008). A Military History of Australia (3rd ed.). Melbourne, Victoria: Cambridge University Press. ISBN 978-0-521-69791-0.
- Hopkins, Ronald (1978). Australian Armour: A History of the Royal Australian Armoured Corps 1927–1972. Puckapunyal, Victoria: Royal Australian Armoured Corps Tank Museum. ISBN 0-642-99407-2.
- Johnston, Mark (2007). The Australian Army in World War II. Elite # 153. Oxford, United Kingdom: Osprey Publishing. ISBN 978-1-84603-123-6.
- Joint Standing Committee on Foreign Affairs, Defence and Trade (2000). From Phantom to Force: Towards a More Efficient and Effective Army. Canberra: Commonwealth of Australia. ISBN 0-642-36628-4.
- Keogh, Eustace (1965). South West Pacific 1941–45. Melbourne, Victoria: Grayflower Publications. OCLC 7185705.
- Khosa, Raspal (2011). Australian Defence Almanac 2011–2012. Canberra: Australian Strategic Policy Institute. OCLC 875618411.
- McCarthy, Dayton (2003). The Once and Future Army: A History of the Citizen Military Forces, 1947–74. New York: Oxford University Press. ISBN 978-0-19-551569-5.
- Millar, Thomas (1974). Committee of Inquiry into the Citizen Military Forces Report. (Millar Report). Canberra: Australian Government Printing Service. OCLC 56289524.
- Odgers, George (1988). Army Australia: An Illustrated History. Frenchs Forest: Child & Associates. ISBN 0-86777-061-9.
- Palazzo, Albert (2001). The Australian Army: A History of its Organisation 1901–2001. Melbourne, Victoria: Oxford University Press. ISBN 978-0-19-551506-0.
- Popple, Jeff (1982). "The Australian Militia 1930–39". Defence Force Journal (33 (March/April)). North Melbourne, Victoria: Department of Defence: 44–48. ISSN 0314-1039.
- Scott, Ernest (1941). Australia During the War. Official History of Australia in the War of 1914–1918, Volume XI (7th ed.). Sydney, New South Wales: Angus and Robertson. ISBN 0-7022-2147-3. OCLC 152414976.
- Shaw, Peter (2010). "The Evolution of the Infantry State Regiment System in the Army Reserve". Sabretache. LI (4 (December)). Garran, Australian Capital Territory: Military Historical Society of Australia: 5–12. ISSN 0048-8933.
- Shephard, Allan (1992). Australian Defence Statistics 1972–1992. Issues Brief. Vol. 20. Canberra: Department of the Parliamentary Library. OCLC 221762314.
- Stanley, Peter (2008). Invading Australia: Japan and the Battle for Australia, 1942. Melbourne, Victoria: Penguin Group (Australia). ISBN 978-0-670-02925-9.
- Thomson, Mark; Davies, Andrew (2008). ADF Capability Review: Australian Army. ASPI Policy Analysis. Vol. 25. Canberra: Australian Strategic Policy Institute. OCLC 682903485.
- Thompson, Peter (2008). Pacific Fury: How Australia and Her Allies Defeated the Japanese Scourge. Sydney, New South Wales: William Heinemann. ISBN 978-1-74166-708-0.
- Wilcox, Craig (1998). For Hearths and Homes: Citizen Soldiering in Australia 1854–1945. St Leonards, New South Wales: Allen & Unwin. ISBN 1-86448-700-3.
