= Western Australia University Regiment =

Australian Army Reserve training unit

- Active: 1949 – present
- Country: Australia
- Branch: Army Reserve
- Type: Training establishment
- Role: Army Reserve officer training
- Part of: Royal Military College, Australia
- Garrison/HQ: Leeuwin Barracks, East Fremantle

The Western Australian University Regiment (WAUR) is an Australian Army Reserve training unit for the 13th Brigade.

== Unit history ==
The regiment was founded as the Perth University Regiment on 22 April 1949 to provide military training to university undergraduates and located at Crawley, Western Australia. It was renamed the Western Australian University Regiment in May 1950.

== Alliances ==
- United Kingdom - The Royal Green Jackets (1955)
