= 13th Brigade (Australia) =

Brigade of the Australian Army

- Active: 1912–1919; 1939–1946; 1948–1960; 1988–present
- Country: Australia
- Allegiance: HM King Charles III
- Branch: Australian Army
- Type: Reserve
- Size: 100 (active); 1,350 (reserve); 30 (civilian)
- Garrison/HQ: Perth, Western Australia
- Engagements: First World War: Western Front; Second World War: Home front; New Britain campaign

Commanders
- Current commander: Brigadier Damian Bushell (as of March 2025)
- Notable commanders: Colonel John Monash (1913-1914); Brigadier Thomas Glasgow (1916–18); Brigadier Sydney Herring (1918–19)

Insignia
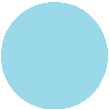
- Unit colour patch

The 13th Brigade is an Army Reserve formation of the Australian Army. Originally formed in 1912 as a Militia formation in Victoria, the brigade was re-raised as a First Australian Imperial Force unit during World War I and fought on the Western Front. In the interwar years, the brigade was re-raised as a part-time formation based in Western Australia and later fought in the New Britain Campaign during World War II.

It is currently headquartered at Perth in Western Australia and has units located across the state in locations such as Geraldton, Kalgoorlie, Albany, Katanning, Joondalup and Rockingham. The current brigade was formed in 1988 and is tasked with the protection of Western Australia. It forms part of the 2nd Division of the Australian Army.

== History ==
The 13th Brigade traces its origins to 1912, when it was formed as a Militia brigade as part of the introduction of the compulsory training scheme, assigned to the 3rd Military District. At this time, the brigade's constituent units were located around Victoria including South Yarra, Prahan, St Kilda, South Melbourne, Albert Park, and Port Melbourne.

=== World War I ===
Following the evacuation of Gallipoli in December 1915, the Australian government decided to expand the Australian Imperial Force by creating three additional divisions on top of the two that already existed. This was achieved by splitting the battalions of the first four brigades that had fought at Gallipoli to provide an experienced cadre for the new battalions that were being formed from reinforcements that had arrived from Australia. Through this process, the 3rd Brigade was divided to form the 13th Infantry Brigade. Assigned to the 4th Australian Division, on formation the brigade consisted of four infantry battalions: the 49th, 50th, 51st and 52nd Battalions.

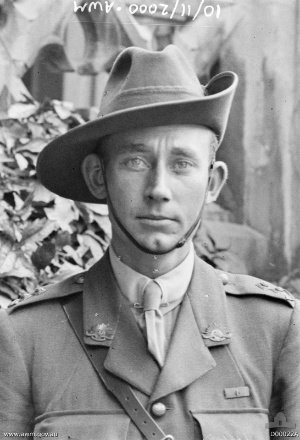
Lieutenant Clifford Sadlier, who received the Victoria Cross for his actions around Villers-Bretonneux in April 1918, while serving with the 51st Battalion.

After undertaking a period of training in Egypt where it had been formed, the 13th Brigade sailed from Alexandria for France on 5 June 1916 upon three transports: Arcadian, Ivernia and Japanese Prince. Upon landing in Marseilles on 11 June, the brigade was transported north by rail. In mid-June, the brigade entered the front line for the first time, moving into a sector near Petillon, in France, relieving the 3rd Brigade.

The brigade remained along the front for several weeks. Although it was relatively quiet, the tour, which lasted until the night of 10/11 July, cost the brigade 41 casualties. After being relieved by the 15th Brigade, the 13th moved to Halloy-les-Pernois, to the west of Pozieres to undertake further training. This included route marches and attacks in concert with artillery to prepare them for entry into the Somme offensive, which had begun on 1 July.

For the next two-and-a-half years, the 13th Brigade took part in the fighting in the trenches along the Western Front in France and Belgium and was engaged in a number of significant actions. Its first major action came at Mouquet Farm in August 1916. This was followed by further actions at Messines and Passchendaele during 1917. The brigade fought at Dernancourt, on the River Ancre, where they fought a defensive action in early 1918.

The brigade's most notable action came during the Allied attack on Villers-Bretonneux on 25 April 1918, during the Second Battle of the Somme that took place amidst the German Spring Offensive in early 1918. The brigade's casualties during the offensive were heavy, and as a result one of its battalions – the 52nd – was broken up and its personnel used to reinforce the other three battalions in mid-May 1918.

After the German offensive was blunted, the remaining three battalions of the brigade undertook further actions as the Allies went on the offensive, launching their Hundred Days Offensive around Amiens in August. They continued operations into late September, attacking the Hindenburg Line. Early the following month, the majority of the Australian Corps brigade was withdrawn from the line for rest.

Following the end of the war, the battalions of the 13th Brigade were returned home and disbanded. The brigade's first commanding officer was Brigadier Thomas Glasgow, who had previously served at Gallipoli with the 1st Light Horse Brigade. When Glasgow was promoted to take over command of the 1st Division in June 1918, he was replaced by Sydney Herring, who commanded the brigade throughout the remainder of the war.

=== Inter-war years and World War II ===
In 1921, following the conclusion of the demobilisation process, Australia's part-time military force, the Citizens Force, was reorganised to perpetuate the numerical designations of the AIF. As a result, the 13th Brigade was re-raised as part of the 5th Military District, headquartered in Perth, Western Australia, and consisted of the 11th, 16th, 28th, and 44th Infantry Battalions. As a mixed brigade, it also included a single light horse regiment: the 10th Light Horse Regiment.

Initially, the Citizens Forces units were maintained through a mixture of voluntary and compulsory service. Throughout the 1920s the compulsory service scheme was adjusted to focus mainly on the populated centres, which meant that the strength of some of the brigade's regional units, such as the 16th Battalion, which was based on the goldfields, was minimal. In late 1929, the scheme was suspended completely by the Scullin Labor government, and replaced by an all-volunteer "Militia" scheme.

As a result, the 11th and 16th Battalions were amalgamated in 1930. They remained linked until 1936 when they were both re-raised in their own right again, as part of an expansion of the Australian military due to concerns about war in Europe. By 1938, the 10th Light Horse had been reassigned as field (non divisional) troops directly assigned to the 5th Military District headquarters. However, they continued to be attached to the 13th Brigade.

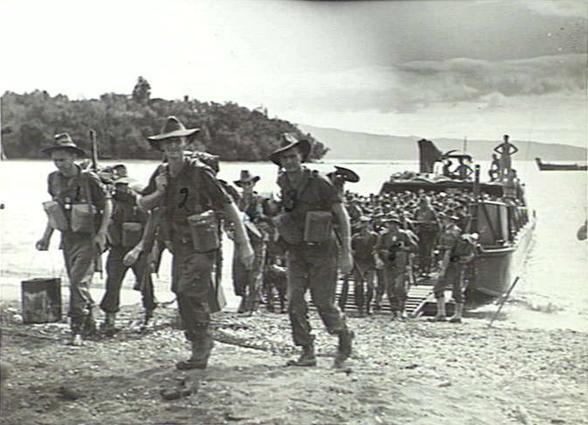
Troops from the 16th Infantry Battalion land on New Britain, March 1945.

The brigade was mobilised for war service in 1939 after the outbreak of the Second World War. Due to the provisions of the Defence Act (1903) it was initially only used as a garrison force. It was mobilised for full-time service following Japan's entry into the war in December 1941, and undertook collective training at Melville Camp until early 1942.

Throughout the first part of 1942 the brigade was the main formation defending the Western Australian coastline from a possible Japanese invasion, as part of the 4th Division. During this time, the 44th Battalion was detached from the brigade and for the remainder of the war its principle units were the 11th, 16th and 28th Infantry Battalions. In 1943, after the threat of a Japanese landing in the west subsided, the brigade was moved north to the Northern Territory, joining the garrison there as part of Northern Territory Force.

They remained in the Northern Territory until 1944 when the 13th Brigade was transferred to the 5th Division. They then embarked overseas to take part in the New Britain campaign against the Japanese, remaining on the island until the end of the war. Combat was limited during the campaign, as the Australians sought mainly to isolate the Japanese garrison, rather than destroy it. After arriving at Jacquinot Bay in November 1944, the brigade moved to Wunung Plantation and then moved to Palmalal Plantation in January 1945.

They took part in the limited advance from the Tol Plantation and conducted patrol operations as the Australians advanced slowly towards Rabaul. At the conclusion of hostilities, the brigade carried out occupation duties. After returning to Australia, the brigade was disbanded in 1946.

Between 1940 and mid-1945, the brigade was commanded by Brigadier Eric McKenzie, who, according to the Australian War Memorial, held the longest brigade command of any Australian officer of the war. McKenzie was replaced by Brigadier Robert Winning in May 1945 who led the brigade through the New Britain campaign.

=== Post war ===
After the Second World War, Australia's wartime military was demobilised. In 1948 the part-time force was re-raised under the guise of the Citizens Military Force. The 13th Brigade was re-raised at this time, once again headquartered in Western Australia, and assigned to Western Command. Upon formation, it consisted of two infantry battalions: the 11th/44th and the 16th/28th.

In 1960, when the Citizens Military Force was reorganised following the adoption of the Pentropic divisional establishment, the brigade was disbanded. It was re-raised again in 1988, and is currently responsible for the bulk of Army Reserve formations in Western Australia.

Assigned to the 2nd Division, it is headquartered in Perth and commands units across Western Australia, based in places such as Joondalup, Rockingham, Geraldton, Kalgoorlie, Albany and Katanning. The brigade's personnel have deployed on operations to the Solomon Islands, East Timor and Afghanistan and have also been deployed to provide aid to the civil community. Under Plan Beersheba, the brigade is tasked with forming a battlegroup along with the 11th Brigade, to support the Regular Army 3rd Brigade when it is the ready brigade.

== Organisation ==
As of 2023 the 13th Brigade consists of:

- 10th Light Horse Regiment
- 11th/28th Battalion, Royal Western Australia Regiment
- 16th Battalion, Royal Western Australia Regiment
- 13th Engineer Regiment
- 13th Combat Service Support Battalion
- 109th Signal Squadron

Former units include:

- 7th Field Battery, Royal Australian Artillery

All units are part of the Army Reserve.
