= 16th Battalion, Royal Western Australia Regiment =

Australian Army Reserve unit

- Cap badge of the Royal Western Australia Regiment
- Active: 1914–1919; 1921–1930; 1936–1946; 1952–1960; 1966–current
- Country: Australia
- Branch: Australian Army
- Type: Light Infantry
- Role: Homeland Security
- Part of: 13th Brigade
- Garrison/HQ: Karrakatta
- March: March of the Cameron Men
- Engagements: First World War: Gallipoli campaign; Western Front; Second World War: New Britain Campaign

Insignia
- Unit colour patch
- Tartan: "Cameron of Erracht". regiments.org. Archived from the original on 16 October 2007.

The 16th Battalion, Royal Western Australia Regiment (16 RWAR) is an Australian Army infantry battalion located in Western Australia and one of the two battalions of the Royal Western Australia Regiment.

The battalion integrates a full-time and part-time workforce to provide a conventional infantry capability to the 2nd Division (Australia), whose primary mission is the defence of the Australian homeland. The battalion was first formed during the First World War, during which it fought during the Gallipoli Campaign and on the Western Front in France and Belgium as part of the Australian Imperial Force. It was re-formed as a part-time unit in Western Australia during the inter-war years, and served in the New Britain Campaign against the Japanese during the Second World War. In the post war years, the battalion became part of the Royal Western Australia Regiment and currently forms part of the 13th Brigade.

== History ==
=== First World War ===
The 16th Battalion was originally raised in September 1914 as part of the all volunteer Australian Imperial Force (AIF), which was raised for overseas service during the First World War. Assigned to the 4th Brigade, the battalion drew the majority of its personnel from the state of Western Australia, while the remainder came from South Australia. After completing rudimentary training in Western Australia and South Australia followed by further basic training in Victoria, the battalion embarked for Egypt. Upon arrival, the 4th Brigade was assigned to the New Zealand and Australian Division, with whom it subsequently participated in the Gallipoli Campaign between April and December 1915.

After returning to Egypt, in early 1916 the AIF underwent a period of expansion and reorganisation, during which the 16th Battalion was split to provide an experienced cadre of personnel to the newly formed 48th Battalion. At the same time, the 4th Brigade was reassigned to the 4th Division and in mid-1916 the AIF's infantry divisions were transferred to Europe to take part in the fighting on the Western Front. For the next two-and-a-half years, the 16th Battalion was involved in several significant battles, including the Battle of Pozières, Battle of Mouquet Farm, Battle of Bullecourt, the German spring offensive, the Battle of Hamel and the Allied Hundred Days Offensive. During the war, the battalion's casualties amounted to 1,127 killed and 1,955 wounded. Three of its members received the Victoria Cross for their actions: Martin O'Meara, Thomas Axford and Dominic McCarthy.

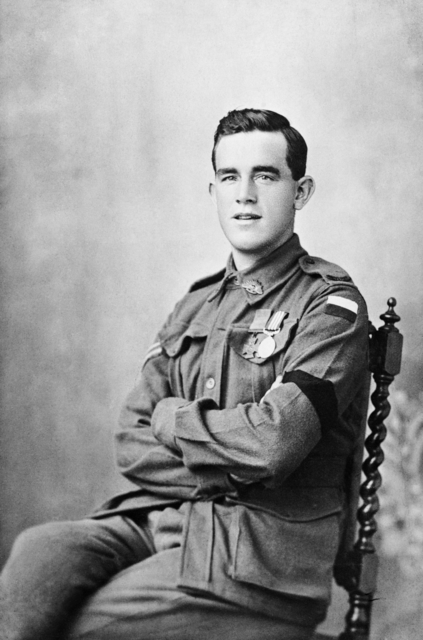
Thomas Axford, one of the 16th Battalion's three Victoria Cross recipients

=== Inter-war years ===
The battalion was disbanded at the end of the war, then re-raised as a Citizens Force unit after a reorganisation of Australia's part-time military forces in 1921 to perpetuate the numerical designations of the AIF, forming part of the 13th Brigade and based in Western Australia. It was amalgamated with the 11th Battalion in 1930, after the suspension of the compulsory training scheme reduced the size of the part-time military force. A new 16th Battalion was raised in 1936 as the "Cameron Highlanders of Western Australia", as part of an expansion of the Militia following concerns about the strategic situation in Europe.

=== Second World War ===
During the Second World War, this battalion was mobilised for war service and gazetted as a battalion of the Second Australian Imperial Force. Throughout the early war years, it formed part of the garrison of Western Australia, before moving north to Darwin in 1943. In late 1944, the 13th Brigade was reassigned to the 5th Division and subsequently took part in the New Britain Campaign from November 1944 until the end of the war. The campaign was limited to containing the larger Japanese force, and the battalion's involvement was focused primarily around undertaking long range patrols. Only limited combat occurred before the end of the war, and the battalion's casualties were light, amounting to 10 killed and 14 wounded.

After undertaking further garrison duties at Rabaul, the 16th Battalion returned to Australia in early 1946 and was disbanded at Puckapunyal, Victoria, in February.

=== Since 1945 ===
The part-time military forces were re-formed in 1948 following the conclusion of the demobilisation process, at which time the battalion was re-raised as an amalgamated unit with the 28th Battalion. The two units remained linked until 1952 when they were split and re-raised in their own right as full battalions. This state of affairs continued until 1960 when a reorganisation saw the raising of larger State-based regiments that subsumed the old regionally-based regiments, at which point the battalion was reduced to a company-level formation within the Pentropic 1st Battalion, Royal Western Australia Regiment (1 RWAR), forming 'B' Company. In 1965, the Pentropic divisional structure was abolished and 1 RWAR was split to form two new battalions: 1 RWAR and 2 RWAR; the following year 1 RWAR was redesignated 16 RWAR.

=== Current Role ===
16 RWAR currently forms part of the 13th Brigade, and maintains the battle honours of all the previous 16th Battalions, including the 16th Battalion, AIF, which served in the First World War, and the 16th Battalion (Cameron Highlanders of Western Australia) and 2/16th Battalion, both of which served in the Second World War.

The battalion deployed individuals and contingnets on operational service including domestic security operations, Solomon Islands, East Timor, Malaysia, Bougainville, Afghanistan and Iraq.

In 2022 the battalion commenced the transition to become a small boat enabled light infantry battalion, by forming a small boat platoon that provides littoral mobility to the battalion.

16 RWAR currently consists of:

- Battalion Headquarters - including the intelligence, quartermaster and administration functions.
- 3 Rifle Companies – ‘B’, 'C' and ‘D’
- Support Company – Reconnaissance and Snipers platoon, Small Boats platoon, Signals platoon.

== Commanding officers ==
The following table lists the Commanding Officers of 16th Battalion:

| From | To | Rank | Name | Notes |
|---|---|---|---|---|
| 13 Oct 1914 | Oct 1915 | LTCOL | Harold Pope CB | |
| Oct 1915 | Jan 1916 | MAJ | Eliezer Margolin, DSO | Acting Commanding Officer whilst Harold Pope was acting as the Commander of the 14th Brigade |
| 27 Jan 1916 | 1 May 1916 | LTCOL | Harold Pope CB | |
| 11 May 1916 | 09 Oct 1917 | LTCOL | Edmund Drake-Brockman, CB, DSO | |
| 09 Oct 1917 | 17 Feb 1918 | LTCOL | Ross Harwood, DSO | Temporary Lieutenant Colonel |
| Feb 1918 | Nov 1918 | LTCOL | Edgar Kendall Baker, VD | |
| 1918 | 1921 | - | - | Disbanded at the end of the First World War |
| 1930 | 30 Nov 1936 | - | - | Linked with the 11th Battalion (City of Perth Regiment) to form the 11th/16th Battalion |
| 01 Dec 1936 | 13 Oct 1939 | LTCOL | Thomas Steane Louch | 16th Battalion, Cameron Highlanders of Western Australia |
| 04 Nov 1939 | 17 Jun 1940 | LTCOL | John Edward Lloyd, MC | 16th Battalion, Cameron Highlanders of Western Australia |
| 15 Aug 1940 | 01 Dec 1942 | LTCOL | William Lachlan Sanderson, MC, OBE | Temporary Lieutenant Colonel of the 16th Battalion, Cameron Highlanders of Western Australia |
| 01 Dec 1942 | 04 Dec 1945 | LTCOL | Ronald John Horley | 16th Battalion, Second Australian Imperial Force |
| 1946 | 1948 | - | - | Disbanded upon demobilisation at the end of World War Two |
| 1948 | 1952 | - | - | Linked with the 28th Battalion (The Swan Regiment) to form the 16th/28th Battalion |
| 1956 | 1958 | LTCOL | R. Davis ED | 16th Battalion, Cameron Highlanders of Western Australia |
| 1965 | 1968 | LTCOL | L. Thompson | 16th Battalion, The Royal Western Australia Regiment |
| 1968 | 1971 | LTCOL | G.R. Sharp | 16th Battalion, The Royal Western Australia Regiment |
| 1971 | 1974 | LTCOL | P.M.R. Smith | 16th Battalion, The Royal Western Australia Regiment |
| 1974 | 1977 | LTCOL | W.R. Mawson RFD ED | 16th Battalion, The Royal Western Australia Regiment |
| 1977 | 1979 | LTCOL | N.A.J. Anderson | 16th Battalion, The Royal Western Australia Regiment |
| 1979 | 1982 | LTCOL | A. Bartsch | 16th Battalion, The Royal Western Australia Regiment |
| 1982 | 1985 | LTCOL | J.R. Elliott | 16th Battalion, The Royal Western Australia Regiment |
| 1985 | 1987 | LTCOL | P.L. Sewell | 16th Battalion, The Royal Western Australia Regiment |
| 1987 | 1990 | LTCOL | A.J. Pritchard | 16th Battalion, The Royal Western Australia Regiment |
| 1990 | 1992 | LTCOL | R.G. Cook | 16th Battalion, The Royal Western Australia Regiment |
| 1992 | 1994 | LTCOL | J.D. Burrows | 16th Battalion, The Royal Western Australia Regiment |
| 1994 | 1996 | LTCOL | S.H. Stanley | 16th Battalion, The Royal Western Australia Regiment |
| 1997 | 1999 | LTCOL | G. Hand AM RFD | 16th Battalion, The Royal Western Australia Regiment |
| 2000 | 2001 | LTCOL | M.E. Page | 16th Battalion, The Royal Western Australia Regiment |
| 2002 | 2004 | LTCOL | S.A. Coggin | 16th Battalion, The Royal Western Australia Regiment |
| 2005 | 2006 | LTCOL | M.S. Redwood | 16th Battalion, The Royal Western Australia Regiment |
| 2007 | 2008 | LTCOL | S.K. L'Estrange | 16th Battalion, The Royal Western Australia Regiment |
| 2009 | 2010 | LTCOL | D.R. Jones | 16th Battalion, The Royal Western Australia Regiment |
| 2012 | 2013 | LTCOL | R. Aitken | 16th Battalion, The Royal Western Australia Regiment |
| 2014 | 2016 | LTCOL | E. Gruber | 16th Battalion, The Royal Western Australia Regiment |
| 2017 | 2019 | LTCOL | C. Waterman | 16th Battalion, The Royal Western Australia Regiment |
| 2020 | 2022 | LTCOL | L. Partridge CSC | 16th Battalion, The Royal Western Australia Regiment |
| 2023 | 2024 | LTCOL | L. Bromley | 16th Battalion, The Royal Western Australia Regiment |
| 2025 | | LTCOL | A. Davidson | 16th Battalion, The Royal Western Australia Regiment |

== Battle honours ==
- First World War: Somme, 1916, '18; Pozières; Bullecourt; Messines, 1917; Ypres, 1917; Menin Road; Polygon Wood; Passchendaele; Arras, 1918; Ancre, 1918; Hamel; Amiens; Albert, 1918; Hindenburg Line; Epéhy; France and Flanders, 1916–18; Anzac; Landing at Anzac; Defence of Anzac; Suvla; Sari Bair; Gallipoli, 1915; and Egypt, 1915–16.
- Second World War: Liberation of Australian New Guinea; Waitavolo; North Africa; Syria 1941; Syrian Frontier; The Litani; Wadi Zeini; Damour; South-West Pacific 1942–1945; Kokoda Trail; Isurava; Eora Creek–Templeton's Crossing I; Efogi–Menari; Ioribaiwa; Buna–Gona; Gona; Ramu Valley; Shaggy Ridge; Borneo 1945; and Balikpapan.

== Regimental march ==
The March of the Cameron Men, composed by Mary Maxwell Campbell in 1829. This is the regimental march of the Queen's Own Cameron Highlanders (now the 4th Battalion (4th Scots), The Royal Regiment of Scotland).

== Alliances ==
- United Kingdom – 4th Battalion (The Highlanders) The Royal Regiment of Scotland.
