= Plan Beersheba =

2014–17 restructuring of the Australian Army

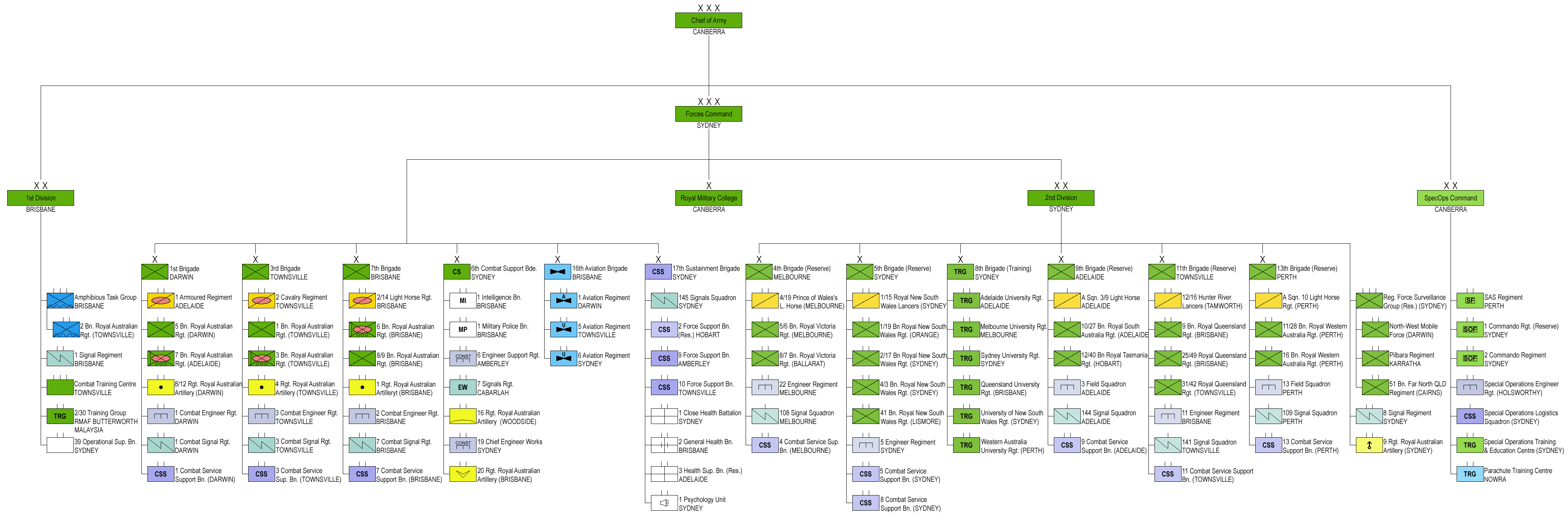
The Australian Army's structure from 2019

Plan Beersheba was a significant restructure of the Australian Army, announced in 2011. The process of implementing the organisational changes began in 2014, and was completed in 2017.

== Changes to the regular Army ==
Under Plan Beersheba, the Army's three regular force combat brigades (the 1st, 3rd and 7th Brigades) were restructured into multi-role formations with a similar structure. Before this time the brigades were structured as mechanised, light infantry and motorised infantry formations respectively.

Following the reorganisation, each of the multi-role brigades comprises:

- Brigade headquarters
- One armoured cavalry regiment (each equipped with M1A1 tanks, ASLAV light armoured vehicles, and M113 armoured personnel carriers)
- Two light infantry battalions
- One artillery regiment
- One combat engineer regiment
- One combat signals regiment
- One combat service support battalion

The three brigades rotate through a 36-month-long readiness cycle, comprising three 12-month phases. These comprise a 'reset' phase during which the brigade's soldiers conduct individual training, a 'readying' phase in which the brigade's units will prepare for combat operations, and a 'ready' phase in which the brigade is available to deploy.

The 2nd Battalion, Royal Australian Regiment specialises in amphibious warfare.

The three combat brigades are supported by the specialist 6th, 16th and 17th Brigades.

== Changes to the Army Reserve ==
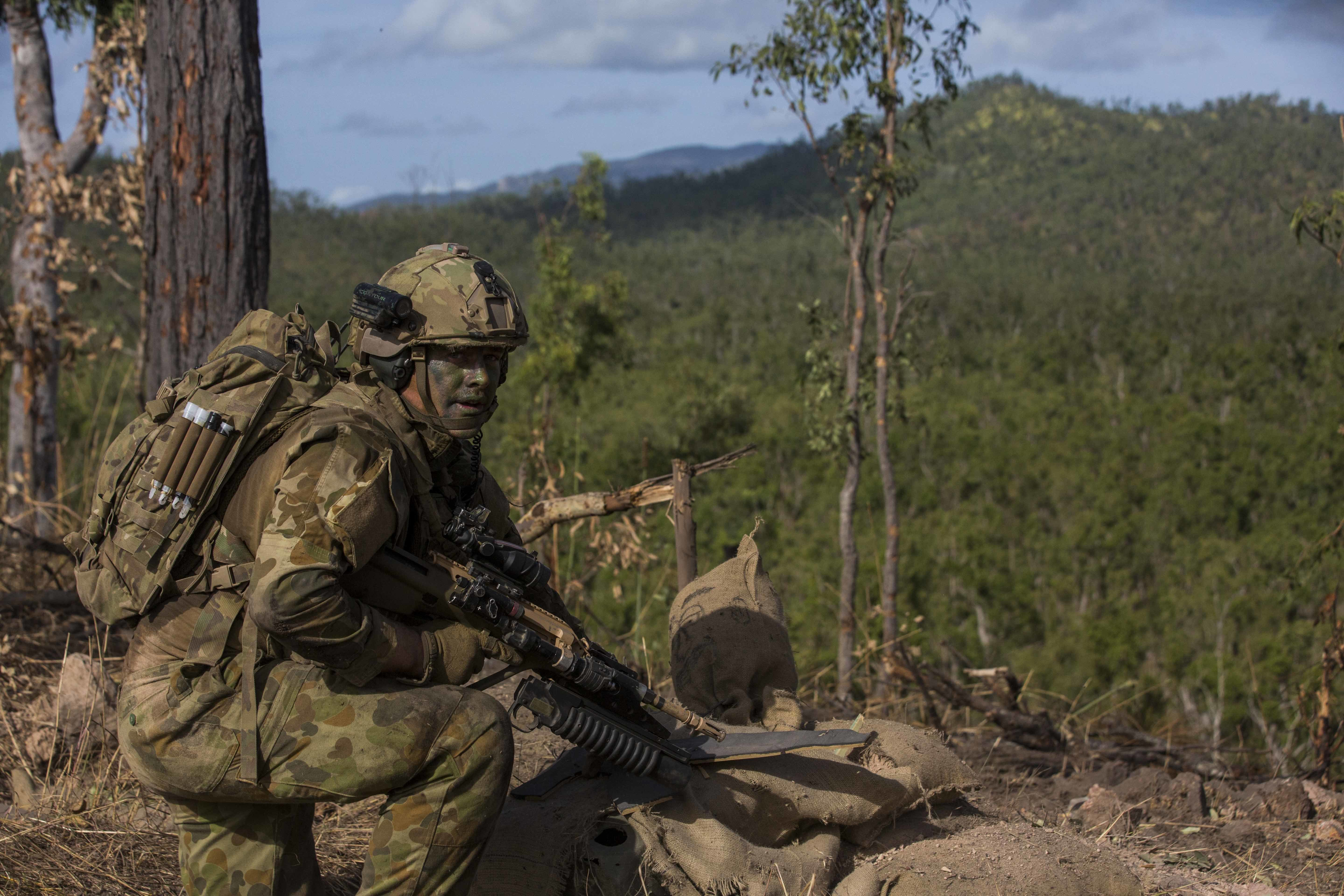
An 8th Brigade soldier during an exercise in 2016 in which the brigade formed Battle Group Waratah to operate alongside the regular 7th Brigade. Such a pairing is a key feature of the Plan Beersheba reforms

Australian Army Reserve units were significantly restructured. As part of the changes, the Army stated that the reserves' role will become "to deliver specified capability and support and sustain Australian Defence Force (ADF) preparedness and operations".

The six reserve brigades in the Army's 2nd Division have also been assigned a new role. Two army reserve brigades have been paired with each of the regular brigades. The 4th and 9th Brigades have partnered with the 1st Brigade, the 5th and 8th Brigades with the 7th Brigade, and the 11th and 13th Brigades with the 3rd Brigade. The pairs of brigades are expected to be able to provide a battalion-sized force upon mobilisation during the regular brigade's 12 month 'ready' phase.

The structure of the reserve brigades has also been changed. The reserve artillery regiments have been re-equipped with mortars, the reserve Royal Australian Armoured Corps units converted from light cavalry to producing crews for Bushmaster Protected Mobility Vehicles, and a brigade operational supply company was established within each of the combat services support battalions.

== 2023 restructure ==
In September 2023 it was announced that the Army would revert to a structure of three combat brigades with specialist roles. The 1st Brigade will become a light infantry unit, the 3rd Brigade an armoured unit and the 7th Brigade a motorised unit. The 10th Brigade will also be re-raised as a fires unit.
