= James Cannan =

Australian general

James Harold Cannan
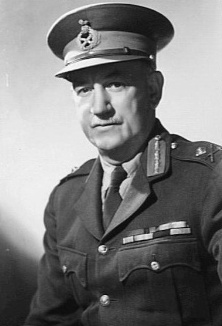
- Major General James Cannan in 1944
- Born: 29 August 1882; Townsville, Queensland
- Died: 23 May 1976 (aged 93); Spring Hill, Queensland
- Military career
- Allegiance: Australia
- Branch: Australian Army
- Service years: 1903–1946
- Rank: Major General
- Service number: VX89075
- Commands: 2nd Division (1940); 2nd Brigade (1920–21); 11th Brigade (1916–19, 1921–25); 15th Battalion (1914–16); 8th Infantry (Oxley) Regiment (1914)
- Conflicts: First World War; Gallipoli Campaign; Landing at Anzac Cove; Battle of Sari Bair; Western Front; Battle of the Somme; Battle of Pozières; Battle of Mouquet Farm; Battle of Messines; Battle of Broodseinde; Battle of Hamel; Battle of Amiens; Hundred Days Offensive; Second World War; Salamaua-Lae campaign; Finisterre Range campaign; Huon Peninsula campaign; New Britain campaign; Aitape-Wewak campaign; Bougainville campaign; Borneo campaign
- Awards: Companion of the Order of the Bath; Companion of the Order of St Michael and St George; Distinguished Service Order; Volunteer Decoration; Mentioned in Despatches (6); Croix de guerre (Belgium)
- Other work: Director of the United Nations Relief and Rehabilitation Administration in the South West Pacific (1946–1947); Director of the Queensland division of the Australian Red Cross (1950–1951); Director of the Services Canteens Trust (1948–1957)

Major General James Harold Cannan, CB, CMG, DSO, VD (29 August 1882 – 23 May 1976) was an Australian Army brigadier general in the First World War and the Quartermaster General during the Second World War.

Cannan assumed command of the 15th Battalion in 1914 and landed with it at Anzac Cove on the evening of Anzac Day, 25 April 1915. The 15th Infantry Battalion garrisoned Quinn's Post, one of the most exposed parts of the Anzac perimeter, with Cannan as post commander. Later, Cannan led his battalion into action again on the Western Front at the Battle of Pozières and Battle of Mouquet Farm. He commanded the 11th Infantry Brigade at the Battle of Messines, the Battle of Broodseinde, and during the Hundred Days Offensive.

Between the wars Cannan worked at Insurance Office of Australia, becoming the manager of its Sydney office in 1932. He remained active in the Militia until he was placed on the unattached list in 1925. During the Second World War, Cannan was recalled to duty in 1940, first as Inspector General of Administration, and then as Quartermaster General. During the course of the war he visited operational areas to prepare and plan the logistical support of operations. Despite his immense responsibility and achievements, he received little recognition. He retired in 1946 as a major general, and was the last surviving Australian general of the First World War before his death in 1976.

== Education and early life ==
James Harold Cannan was born in Townsville, Queensland on 29 August 1882, the sixth child of John Kearsey Cannan, a Brisbane bank manager and his wife Elizabeth Christian née Hodgson. He was educated at Brisbane Central Boys' State School and Brisbane Grammar School. James was employed by a firm of hardware merchants, and later worked for seven years for New Zealand Insurance. He was chief agent at the Queensland branch of the Patriotic Assurance Company and then from 1910 was the state manager of the Insurance Office of Australia. Cannan married Eileen Clair Ranken on 12 December 1911. Their marriage produced no children.

Cannan was commissioned as a lieutenant in the 1st Queensland (Moreton) Regiment on 27 March 1903. He transferred to the 9th Infantry Regiment on 1 July 1903. He was promoted to captain on 24 September 1907 and major on 14 August 1911. On 1 July 1912, he transferred to the 8th Infantry (Oxley Battalion). He took command of the battalion and was promoted to lieutenant colonel on 9 May 1914.

== First World War ==
=== Gallipoli ===
When the First World War broke out, Cannan was appointed to command the Lytton Fixed Defences, holding this post from 5 to 31 August 1914. He joined the Australian Imperial Force (AIF) on 23 September 1914 with the rank of lieutenant colonel, and assumed command of the 15th Battalion. His older brother, Captain D. H. Cannan, was also one of the original officers of this battalion, the Queensland and Tasmanian battalion in Colonel John Monash's 4th Infantry Brigade. They embarked for the Middle East from Melbourne on the transport HMAT Ceramic on 22 December 1914. The ship passed through the Suez Canal safely, arriving at Alexandria on 31 January 1915, although a Turkish force was operating in the nearby desert. The 4th Infantry Brigade encamped at Heliopolis, where it resumed its training.

The 15th Infantry Battalion arrived at Anzac Cove on the evening of Anzac Day, 25 April 1915. Cannan was sent with half of his battalion to fill the gap between the 2nd and 3rd Infantry Brigades. Moving in the dark through the thick scrub of the Razorback, the 15th found in the scrub the empty positions that it was sent to fill. The 15th Infantry Battalion was soon switched to Quinn's Post, one of the most exposed parts of the Anzac perimeter, with Cannan becoming post commander.

In the Battle of Sari Bair on 8 August 1915, the 15th Infantry Battalion suffered heavily, having seven officers killed—including Cannan's older brother, Major D. H. Cannan—and most of the rest wounded. Cannan became ill and was evacuated from Anzac on 4 October 1915, and transferred to hospitals on Lemnos and Malta, before being sent to the 3rd London General Hospital in England. For "distinguished service in the field during operations in the Dardanelles", Cannan was mentioned in despatches and made a Companion of the Order of the Bath on 5 November 1915.

=== Western Front ===
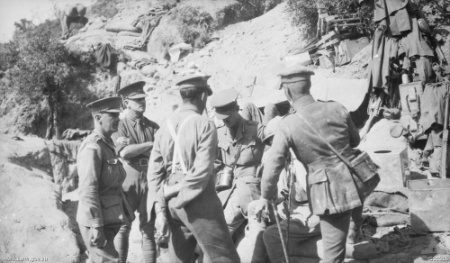
Major General Alexander Godley (right) at Quinn's Post, Anzac with Brigadier General Harry Chauvel (left). Cannan is the officer in his shirt sleeves.

Cannan resumed command of the 15th Battalion in Egypt on 21 January 1916. It departed Alexandria for Marseille on 1 June 1916, to join the British Expeditionary Force on the Western Front. Cannan led his battalion into action again at the Battle of Pozières and Battle of Mouquet Farm. On the night of 8 August 1916, the 15th Infantry Battalion launched an attack on the German trench in front of Mouquet Farm known as Park Lane. Cannan's men captured their objectives, and indeed went beyond them in some places. However, the Suffolk Regiment on his flank was mown down by German machine gun fire and Cannan was compelled to withdraw part of his force to a more defensible position.

On 30 August 1916, Cannan was appointed to command the 11th Infantry Brigade by Major General John Monash, now commander of the 3rd Division. At this time the 3rd Division—of which the 11th Infantry Brigade was part—was training on the Salisbury Plain in England. Cannan returned to France with the 11th Infantry Brigade in November 1916, and led it in the Battle of Messines in June 1917 and the Battle of Broodseinde in October 1917. For these battles, Cannan was made a Companion of the Order of St Michael and St George. His citation read:

Commander of the 11th Australian Infantry Brigade since September 1916. This officer has served continuously since the outbreak of war and received the CB upon the landing in Gallipoli. He commanded a battalion in Gallipoli, Egypt and France until September 1916. He had held a brigade command throughout the offensive period of 1917 taking part in the battle of Messines June 1917. Subsequently he commanded the series of operations which led to the capture of the Windmill on 31 July 1917 and also commanded the right brigade of this division in the highly successful battle for the Broodesinde Ridge on 4 October 1917, again taking part in the battle of 12 October 1917. His services as a brigade commander have throughout been extinguished [sic] by great energy, ability and leadership.

In the fighting in 1918, the 11th Infantry Brigade was the first to check the German advance towards Amiens, repelling a German attack at Morlancourt in late March. In July, it was selected from the brigades of the 3rd Division to participate in the Battle of Hamel. The 11th Brigade went on to participate in the Battle of Amiens and the Hundred Days Offensive. For the battles of August and September, Cannan was awarded the Distinguished Service Order. His citation read:

For his very distinguished services in command of his brigade forming the right flank of the attack of the divisional attack at Bony on 29 September – 1 October 1918. His clear insight into an extremely difficult tactical situation, coupled with the energy and resolution with which he directed the operations of his brigade were of the greatest value in forcing the enemy to give up his hope of holding the Hindenburg Line. General Cannan's conduct and skill throughout the last Somme campaign gave a conspicuous example of the soldierly merit to his brigade and to the division. The great difficulties in establishing and maintaining communications rendered the action at Bony a matter of personal leadership and in this General Cannan proved himself the right man in the right place.

For his services on the Western Front, Cannan was also awarded the Belgian Croix de Guerre, his citation noting his "tenacity, thoroughness and efficient organisation", "his splendid qualities of leadership", and his "personal gallantry." He was mentioned in despatches another five times.

== Between the wars ==
Cannan studied insurance practice in London under the Army Education Scheme for two months before embarking for Australia on HMAT Ancises on 22 August 1919. He arrived back in Australia on 17 October 1919 and his appointment to the AIF was terminated on 13 December 1919. Cannan had been made a brevet colonel in the Militia on 24 September 1917 but he was entitled to keep his AIF rank of brigadier general as an honorary rank.

Cannan returned to his old job at Insurance Office of Australia. He became manager of the Sydney office in 1932 and presided over the Insurance Institute of New South Wales from 1936 to 1937. He was also president of the Queensland branch of the Returned Soldiers' and Sailors' Imperial League of Australia from 1920 to 1921, and became the first president of the Brisbane branch of Legacy Australia in 1928.

Cannan commanded the 2/15th Infantry from 1 October 1918 to 30 June 1920, although he did not actually take up command until 14 December 1919. On 1 July 1920, he became a substantive colonel and honorary brigadier general on assuming command of the 2nd Infantry Brigade. He then commanded the 11th Mixed Brigade from 1 May 1921 to 30 April 1925, when he was transferred to the unattached list. Cannan was also aide de camp to the Governor General from 1 April 1920 to 21 March 1923 and honorary colonel of the 47th Infantry Battalion from 19 June 1930.

== Second World War ==
On 27 May 1940, after over fifteen years on the unattached list, Cannan was appointed Inspector General of Administration at the Department of Defence Coordination. Although his tenure was brief, Cannan gained valuable experience working with the bureaucracy. On 7 July 1940, Cannan was promoted to temporary major general and took over command of the 2nd Division in succession to Major General Iven Mackay, who had been appointed to command the 6th Division.

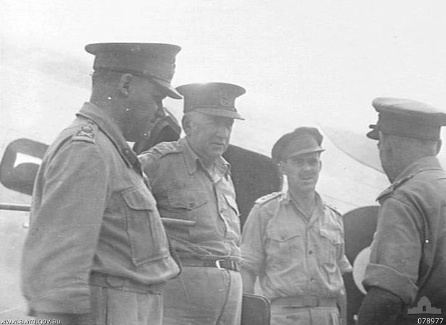
Major General J. E. S. Stevens of the 6th Division (right) greets Lieutenant General John Northcott (left) and Major General J. H. Cannan (second from left) on their arrival at Tadji Airstrip.

Because most Australian soldiers were Militia, the government decided in 1940 that there should be "direct Militia representation on the Military Board at Army Headquarters." The appointment of a Militia officer to the board was opposed by the Chief of the General Staff, Lieutenant General Vernon Sturdee, but when he was overruled by the Prime Minister, Robert Menzies, Sturdee offered the post to Cannan. On 24 October 1940, Cannan became Quartermaster General and a member of the Military Board. His experience as a businessman gave him managerial skills that were to prove particularly useful. Cannan offered to resign in 1942 so that his post could be given to a regular officer, but General Sir Thomas Blamey refused to countenance it, and Cannan remained Quartermaster General until 31 December 1945. However, in the 1942 reorganisation, the Military Board was abolished and Cannan now reported to the Lieutenant General Administration, Lieutenant General Henry Wynter, instead. Cannan volunteered for the Second Australian Imperial Force and was allotted the serial number VX89075 on 2 September 1942.

As Quartermaster General, Cannan was responsible for the Australian Army's supply, transport and engineering services throughout Australia and the South West Pacific Area. It was the most important logistical command in Australian history. In carrying it out, he clashed repeatedly with the Department of Defence Coordination in its attempt to maintain peacetime financial controls. Cannan had to work long hours and use all of his skills both as a soldier and a businessman. He had to attempt to keep ahead of the plans at General Headquarters in order to ensure that the required logistical support would be there on time. Colonel G. Drake-Brockman considered Cannan "a man of great personality and charm with tremendous drive" whose administration was "outstanding".

As well as supporting the Australian Army, Cannan was also responsible for providing a broad range of goods and services to the Americans. In no other theatre of war was local procurement of supplies by US forces as extensive or important as in the South West Pacific. Australian Reverse Lend Lease came to USD $1.1 billion, representing 13% of all reciprocal aid to the United States. Such figures understate the value of Australian aid, for every ton of supplies procured in Australia meant a ton that did not have to be shipped across the Pacific Ocean. This required the same shipping space as two tons of supplies shipped across in the Atlantic Ocean, the distance there being half as great. Cannan was responsible for rationing the American forces in Australia until the American Quartermaster Corps felt capable of taking over the function in 1943. When requirements to support the British Pacific Fleet were piled on top of American demands and an increasing tight Army manpower situation, Cannan protested the "lavishness and extravagance which characterised US demands whilst the Australian services' demands were being subjected to rigid scrutiny and economies", citing examples, and urged that economies be made on goods and services supplied to Allied countries. However the government was reluctant to take any action that might not be welcomed by American military and political leaders. Nonetheless, Prime Minister John Curtin did successfully persuade General Douglas MacArthur to rationalise his use of Australian resources in order to provide accommodation for the British Pacific Fleet.

Cannan travelled widely in the combat areas to see conditions at first hand. He visited New Guinea between 19 October and 21 December 1943 and in February and March 1944. In October 1944, Cannan travelled with General Blamey to visit General Douglas MacArthur in Hollandia in order to prepare for Philippines campaign. In the event, plans to employ Australian troops in the Philippines fell through and they were employed in the Borneo Campaign instead. Cannan visited New Britain, Lae, Hollandia, Bougainville and Aitape in February 1945 to help plan the final campaigns and Hollandia, Morotai, Labuan and Darwin in August 1945.

== Later life ==
Cannan received no honours for the Second World War. Blamey nominated him for a Knight Commander of the Order of the British Empire in September 1943, but it was refused, it not being the Labor government's policy to award knighthoods at this time. In November 1945, Blamey was abruptly dismissed by the government. Asked if he wanted any honours for himself, Blamey declined, instead requesting knighthoods for his generals, including Cannan. His request was refused. In December 1949, the government changed and Blamey wrote to the new Prime Minister, Robert Menzies, once again recommending knighthoods for a number of his generals, including Cannan. All were accepted "except, for some inexplicable reason, for Cannan". Of Cannan, it was said that his "contribution to the defence of Australia was immense; his responsibility for supply, transport and works, a giant-sized burden; his acknowledgement—nil".

Cannan relinquished his appointment as Quartermaster General on 31 December 1945 and retired as a major general the next day. He remained an honorary colonel until 8 June 1953. His abilities as an administrator were still in demand. He was Director of the United Nations Relief and Rehabilitation Administration in the South West Pacific from 1946 to 1947, of the Queensland division of the Australian Red Cross from 1950 to 1951, and of the Services Canteens Trust from 1948 to 1957. He was also a director of several companies. Survived by his wife Eileen, Cannan died on 23 May 1976. He became the last of Australia's Great War generals to pass away, and was cremated with full military honours.

== Notes ==
Military offices
Preceded by Major General Iven Mackay	General Officer Commanding 2nd Division; 1940	Succeeded by Major General Herbert Lloyd
