= Burford Sampson =

Australian politician and soldier

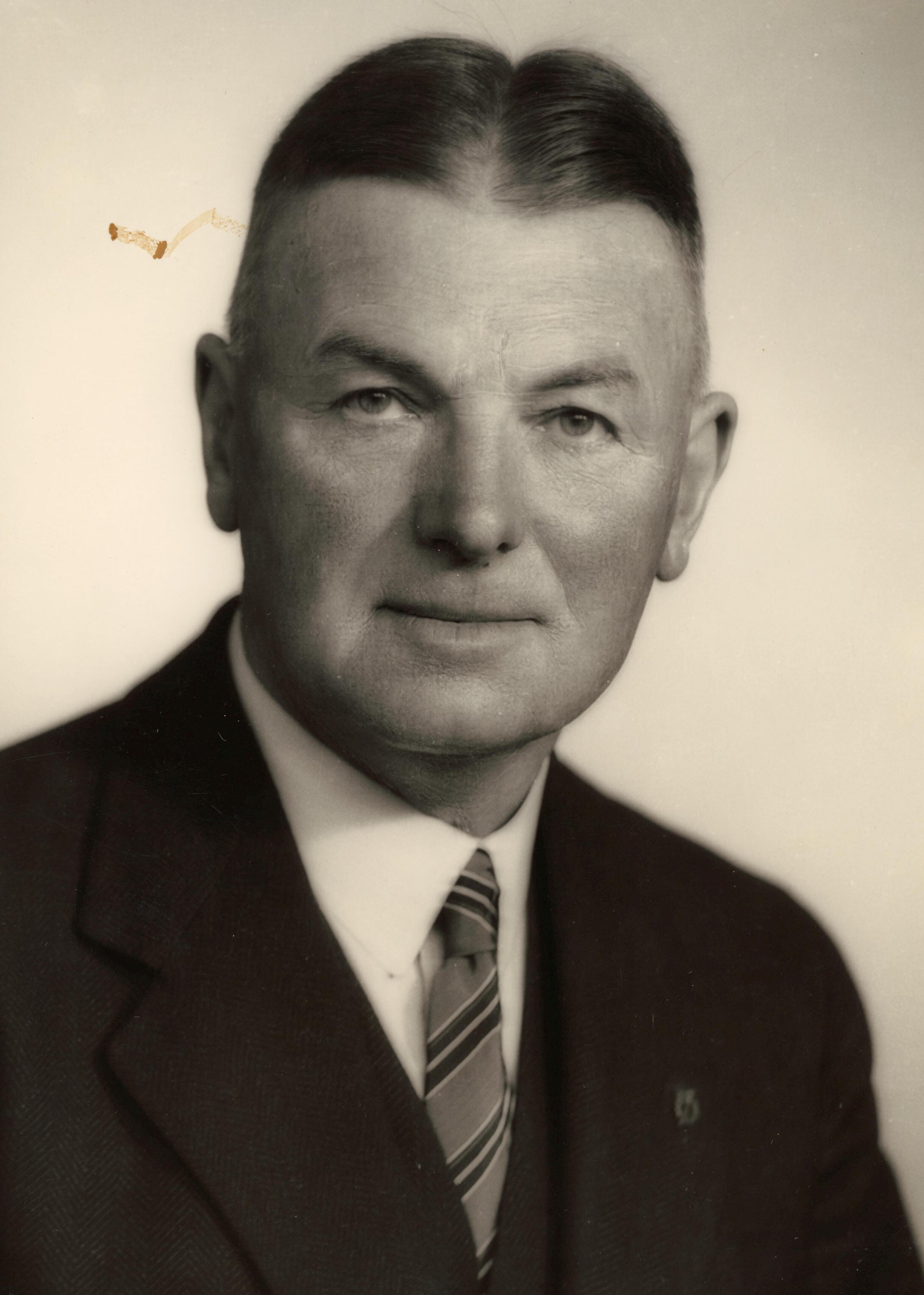

Senator for Tasmania
- In office 14 November 1925 – 30 June 1938
- Preceded by: Charles Grant
- In office 1 July 1941 – 30 June 1947

Personal details
- Born: 30 March 1882 Launceston, Tasmania, Australia
- Died: 5 June 1959 (aged 77) Pennant Hills, New South Wales, Australia
- Party: Nationalist (to 1931); UAP (1931–45); Liberal (from 1945)
- Spouse(s): Jane Cocker (m. 1910; died 1932) Dorothy Jackson (m. 1941)

Military service
- Allegiance: Australia
- Branch/service: Australian Army
- Years of service: 1907–1931
- Rank: Colonel
- Commands: 12th Battalion; 15th Battalion
- Battles/wars: First World War

Burford Sampson DSO (30 March 1882 – 5 June 1959) was an Australian politician and soldier. He was a Senator for Tasmania from 1925 to 1938 and from 1941 to 1947.

Sampson was born in Launceston, Tasmania. During the Boer War he served with the South African Constabulary and later worked in Rhodesia for several years with the British South Africa Police. Sampson joined the Australian Imperial Force on the outbreak of World War I and was wounded on the Gallipoli campaign. He later served on the Western Front, briefly commanding the 15th Battalion. Outside of his military service he worked variously as a labourer, farmer, miner, sawmill manager and public servant.

Sampson was first elected to the Senate as a Nationalist at the 1925 federal election, joining the United Australia Party in 1931. He was defeated at the 1937 election but was re-elected to a final term in 1940. He joined the new Liberal Party in 1945 and was defeated again at the 1946 election, unsuccessfully standing as an independent in 1949. Sampson was a backbencher but was active on various Senate committees. He was chairman of committees from 1935 to 1938.

== Early life ==
Sampson was born on 30 March 1882 in Launceston, Tasmania. He was the son of Emily Louisa (née Pollard) and Joseph Tasker Sampson, both of whom had moved to Tasmania as children from Yorkshire, England.

Sampson's father died when he was five years old and his widowed mother subsequently ran the family's grocery store in Launceston. He attended Launceston High School and the Commercial College, leaving in 1896. At the age of 15 he moved to Lower Barrington to work as a farm labourer. As a young man he witnessed Joshua Slocum's visit to Tasmania as part of his solo circumnavigation; he provided an eyewitness account to one of Slocum's biographers in the 1950s.

In 1899, Sampson joined a colonial militia based in Launceston, subsequently transferring to the Tasmanian Infantry Regiment. During the Boer War, he was rejected for enlistment in an Australian regiment but worked his way to South Africa in 1900 as a stoker. Sampson enlisted in the South African Constabulary, a paramilitary policing unit, initially working as a mounted trooper and later as a detective in the Orange River Colony and Matabeleland. He was awarded the Queen's South Africa Medal for his service. In 1903, Sampson moved to Rhodesia and joined the British South Africa Police. After being discharged in 1907 he worked at the Globe and Phoenix Mine for a period.

Sampson had returned to Australia by 1910 and worked for timber merchants J. & T. Gunn for a period. He was later employed by Hinman, Wright & Manser. He played Australian rules football for the North Launceston Football Club (of which he later served as president) and was a member of the Tamar Rowing Club.

== World War I and aftermath ==
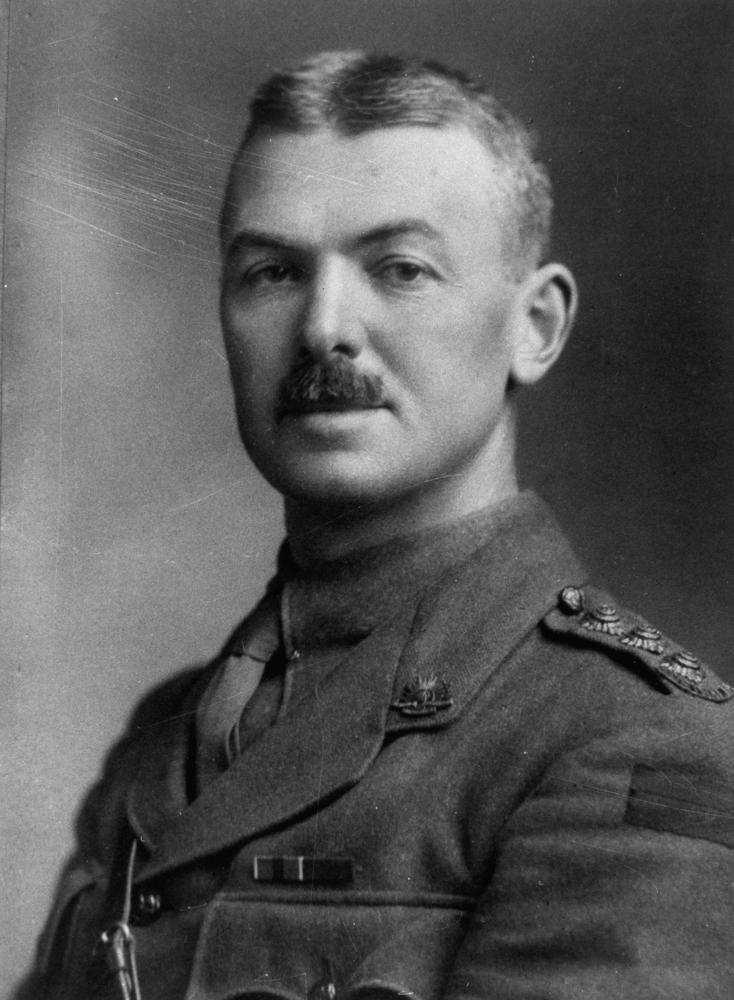
Sampson in military uniform in 1915

In 1913, Sampson was commissioned as a second lieutenant in the 92nd (Launceston) Infantry Regiment, part of the Citizen Military Forces. He joined the Australian Imperial Force (AIF) in December 1914 and served on the Gallipoli campaign as part of the 15th Battalion, participating in the landing at Anzac Cove. Promoted to captain in May 1915, he was wounded at Quinn's Post and evacuated in July 1915 after receiving further wounds from a Turkish shell.

Sampson recuperated in England and rejoined the 15th Battalion in France in May 1917. He was again wounded in action in August 1917 and was promoted major in September 1917. He was part of the headquarters staff of the 4th Brigade for several months in early 1918. Sampson briefly commanded the 15th Battalion during their final battle around Jeancourt in September 1918. He was awarded the Distinguished Service Order and oversaw the demobilisation of Australian troops from France prior to his own discharge from the AIF in March 1920. During the Paris Peace Conference he attended a dinner alongside Australian prime minister Billy Hughes who encouraged him to enter politics.

After returning to Tasmania, Sampson faced a period of unemployment and in a Senate speech described himself as "more or less a nervous wreck for a couple of years". He served as commander of a reserve unit, the 12th Battalion, from 1922 to 1931 and was active in the Returned Sailors' and Soldiers' Imperial League of Australia and the Legacy Club. Outside of his continued involvement with the military he worked as manager of a sawmill in Stanley for a period and was later appointed as an immigration officer with the Tasmanian state government, based in Launceston.

== Politics ==
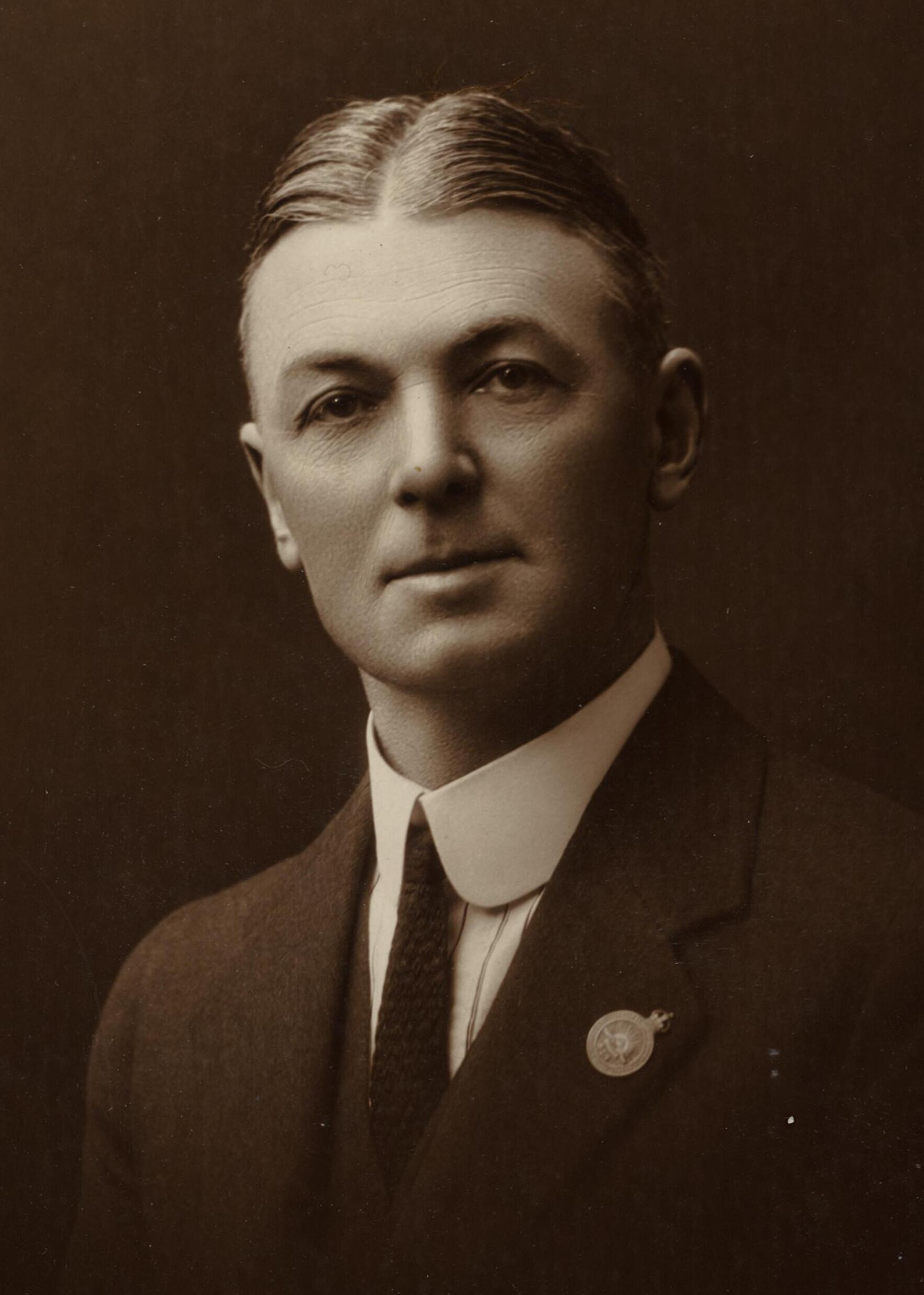
Sampson c. 1925

In 1925, Sampson was involved in the creation of the Tasmanian Rights League. He was the league's assistant secretary and travelling organiser for several months, raising his public profile. In July 1925, he was an unsuccessful candidate for the Senate casual vacancy caused by the resignation of Nationalist Party senator George Foster. He received only a single vote when the parliament of Tasmania met to elect Charles Grant as Foster's replacement.

At the 1925 federal election, Sampson was elected to a six-year Senate term commencing on 1 July 1926. Under the constitutional provisions at the time, he took his seat in parliament immediately, replacing Grant to fill the remainder of Foster's original term. Sampson was re-elected at the 1931 election, having joined the new United Australia Party (UAP) with his Nationalist colleagues. He lost his seat at the 1937 election, but was re-elected in 1940. He joined the new Liberal Party in 1945, but lost his seat at the 1946 election and concluded his term on 30 June 1947. He unsuccessfully sought re-election as an independent at the 1949 election, after losing the Liberal preselection ballot. In a private letter to his Senate colleague George McLeay he wrote that he had been a victim of a "dirty intrigue" and described the successful preselection candidates Allan Guy and Denham Henty as "twirps".

Sampson remained on the backbench throughout his time in parliament but was active on a number of Senate committees. He served as chairman of committees (deputy president of the Senate) from 1935 to 1938. Sampson served on the Joint Select Committee on Commonwealth Electoral Law and Procedure (1926–1927), the Joint Statutory Committee on Public Works (1929–1931), the Senate Select Committee on the Central Reserve Bank Bill (1930), the Joint Committee for the Survey of Manpower and Resources (1941–1942), and the Joint Standing Committee on War Expenditure (1944–1946). He also served on the Constitutional Convention convened by the Curtin government in 1942.

Sampson has been identified as the only Australian senator to serve in each of the Boer War, World War I and World War II, although his service during World War II was in a domestic capacity.

=== Political views ===
Sampson's primary area of interest in the Senate was defence. He was a consistent advocate for compulsory military service and for employment preference to be given to returned servicemen. During World War II he successfully advocated for the tightening of regulations requiring conscientious objectors to serve in non-combatant roles and called for "the conscription of all manpower and resources, the creation of one army, and Australia's integration into a strategy of imperial defence".

Sampson was active in the Tasmanian branch of the League of Nations Union and was initially a strong supporter of the organisation. By the late 1930s he had become disillusioned with the League and regarded it as a failure. Following World War II he warned that collective security was a "mirage".

Sampson supported increased immigration to Australia although he was strongly in favour of the White Australia policy. He was also interested in electoral reform and in 1945 wrote to ALP prime minister Ben Chifley to criticise the existing Senate electoral system, which he described as "about as bad a voting system as such can be". He supported the introduction of proportional representation, which was implemented in 1949.

== Personal life ==
In 1910, Sampson married Jane Cocker, with whom he had two sons. His first wife committed suicide by hanging herself in 1932. According to his son Richard his wife's death had a profound impact on him and he "virtually gave up living in the sense that he just didn't seem to care what happened to him".

In the period after his first Senate term, Sampson moved to Melbourne and became secretary of the Wine and Spirit Association of Victoria. He later served as a deputy director of recruiting from 1940 to 1941, attached to Headquarters Southern Command. In 1941 he remarried to Dorothy Jackson (née Gibbons).

Sampson retired to Sydney in 1951. He died on 5 June 1959 in the suburb of Pennant Hills.
