= Henry Dalziel =

Australian recipient of the Victoria Cross (1893–1965)

Henry Dalziel VC
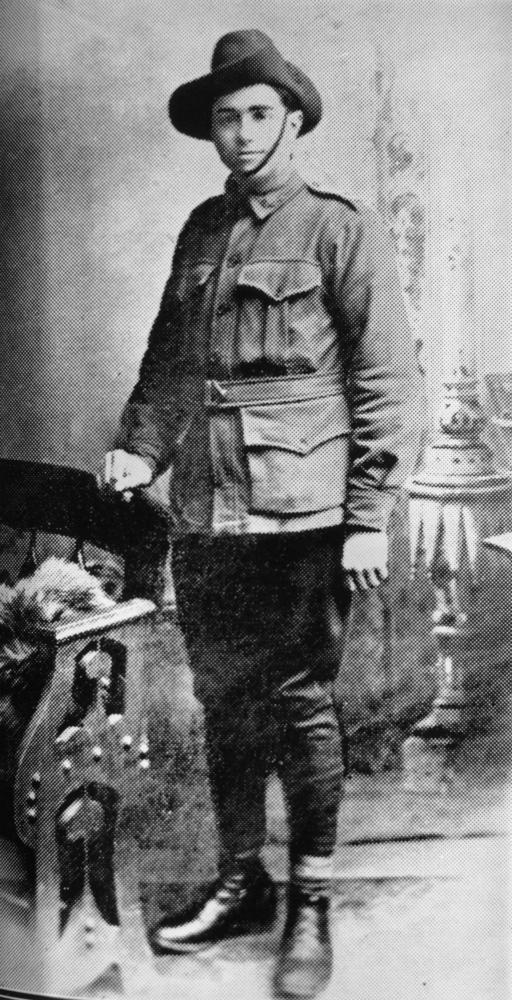
- Private Henry Dalziel, c. 1919
- Born: 18 February 1893; Irvinebank, Queensland
- Died: 24 July 1965 (aged 72); Greenslopes Repatriation Hospital, Brisbane, Queensland
- Burial place: Mt Thompson Crematorium
- Military career
- Allegiance: Australia
- Branch: Australian Army
- Service years: 1915–1919; 1933–1943
- Rank: Sergeant
- Unit: 15th Battalion (Queensland & Tasmania)
- Conflicts: First World War; Battle of the Somme; Battle of Pozières; Battle of Mouquet Farm; Battle of Messines; Battle of Passchendaele; Battle of Hamel
- Awards: Victoria Cross

Henry Dalziel, VC (18 February 1893 – 24 July 1965) was an Australian recipient of the Victoria Cross (VC), the highest award for gallantry in the face of the enemy that can be awarded to British and Commonwealth forces. He was awarded the VC while serving with the Australian Imperial Force during the First World War. Dalziel's VC was the 1,000th awarded. After the war, Dalziel returned to Australia and tried to make a living by farming. Troubled by the injuries he sustained during the war, he left the land and took up factory work. He moved between jobs several times during the 1930s, and led something of a transient lifestyle, even at one stage turning to gold prospecting. In the mid-1930s he rejoined the army in a part-time capacity and during the Second World War served in a training role in Australia. He died in 1965 at the age of 72.

== Early life ==
Henry Dalziel, the son of a Queensland miner, was born on 18 February 1893 in Irvinebank. After completing his education he began working as a fireman on the railway.

== First World War ==
Dalziel volunteered for the Australian Imperial Force (AIF) in early 1915 and was posted to the 15th Battalion as a reinforcement. He served throughout the Gallipoli Campaign until he was evacuated, along with the rest of his battalion, to Egypt in December 1915. From July 1916, he served on the Western Front in France and fought in the Battles of the Somme, Pozières and Mouquet Farm. His service continued into 1917, including the Battle of Messines, but he was wounded at Polygon Wood during the Battle of Passchendaele. He returned to the front in June 1918.

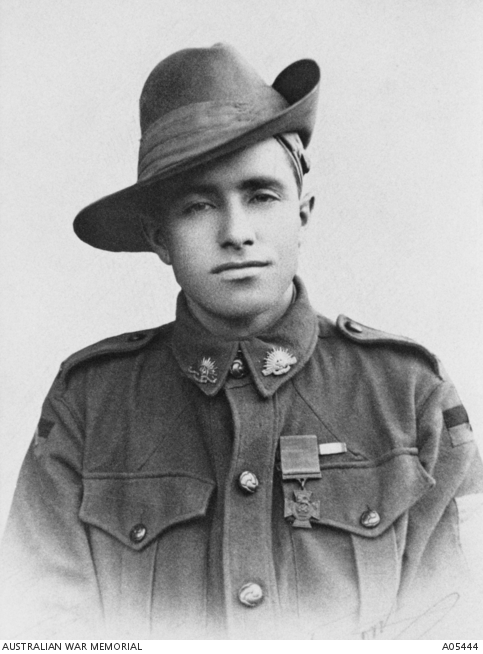
Private Henry Dalziel in England circa 1918, wearing a bandage under his hat

It was during the Battle of Hamel that Dalziel performed the deed for which he was awarded the Victoria Cross (VC). Assigned to the battalion's transport company as a driver, he volunteered to join the attack to make up for a manpower shortage that the battalion was experiencing at that time. On 4 July 1918 at Hamel Wood, when determined resistance was coming from an enemy strong-point which was also protected by strong wire entanglements, Dalziel, armed only with a revolver, attacked an enemy machine-gun. He killed or captured the entire crew and, although severely wounded in the hand, carried on until the final objective was captured. He twice went over open ground under heavy artillery and machine-gun fire to obtain ammunition and, although suffering from loss of blood, continued to fill magazines and serve his gun until wounded in the head. (Note: Dalziel's personal account of the action was as follows: "We were harassed by murderous fire from a nearby enemy stronghold, the Australian advance was held up. My gun had cleaned up one [machinegun] nest, but another planted in a different direction opened fire. I dashed at it killing seven Germans with my two revolvers. One German bloodhound wounded me in the hand, but I soon had him on the ground. I lunged at him with my German dagger, catching him right over the heart. His dying cry upset me and I shivered.") The citation for his VC, published in the London Gazette, read:

For most conspicuous bravery and devotion to duty when in action with a Lewis gun section. His company met with determined resistance from a strong point which was strongly garrisoned, manned by numerous machine-guns and, undamaged by our artillery fire, was also protected by strong wire entanglements. A heavy concentration of machine-gun fire caused many casualties, and held up our advance. His Lewis gun having come into action and silenced enemy guns in one direction, an enemy gun opened fire from another direction. Private Dalziel dashed at it and with his revolver, killed or captured the entire crew and gun, and allowed our advance to continue. He was severely wounded in the hand, but carried on and took part in the capture of the final objective. He twice went over open ground under heavy enemy artillery and machine-gun fire to secure ammunition, and though suffering from considerable loss of blood, he filled magazines and served his gun until severely wounded through the head. His magnificent bravery and devotion to duty was an inspiring example to all his comrades and his dash and unselfish courage at a critical time undoubtedly saved many lives and turned what would have been a serious check into a splendid success.

— The London Gazette, 17 August 1918

Dalziel's VC was the 1,000th such medal to be awarded. His wounds were so severe that his brain was exposed and he was evacuated to England for medical treatment. It was not until January 1919 that he returned to Australia.

== Later life ==
Discharged from the AIF in July 1919, the following year he married Ida Maude Ramsay, who had served as a nurse with the 17th Australian General Hospital. The couple took up a block of land for farming but his wife was primarily responsible for its running. After a few years, Dalziel tired of farming and moved to Sydney, where he took up factory work. His wife remained on the farm. He then tried his hand at gold mining in the Bathurst region before later returning to the farm when his wife became ill. By 1933, he was living in Brisbane but out of work. At this time, having maintained an interest in song writing since his time in hospital recuperating from his war wounds, he had some of his work published in England and the United States.

From 1933, Dalziel served in the Citizen Military Forces and was a sergeant in the 9th/15th Battalion. During the Second World War, he did not serve abroad. Instead he supported recruitment and funding drives. He also conducted talks for troops at training camps. His final posting before he was discharged from the Army in December 1943 was to the 11th Training Battalion. In 1956, he travelled to England for the VC centenary celebrations. In late life, Dalziel lived in Oxley.

On 24 July 1965, Dalziel had a stroke and died at the Greenslopes Private Hospital in Brisbane. He was cremated with full military honours. A plaque in his memory is laid at Mount Thompson crematorium, Brisbane.

== Legacy ==
On 25 November 2010, a group of Dalziel's medals and associated documents were auctioned by Noble Numismatics in Sydney, fetching AUD $525,000.

Tributes to Henry Dalziel VC include:

1. Dalziel Street in Nundah, an inner suburb of Brisbane, was named after him in about 1948.
2. Dalziel Avenue in Atherton, Queensland bears his name.
3. Henry Dalziel Oval at Irvinebank, Queensland is named in his honour.
4. There is a memorial to Henry at Loudon House Museum at Irvinebank.
5. The bar at the Atherton, Queensland, Returned Servicemen's Club is called The Harry Dalziel VC Memorial Bar.
6. In a park in Atherton a mounted WWI artillery piece stands as a memorial to Private Harry Dalziel VC.
7. The Army barracks at Enoggera (Queensland) and Singleton (NSW) both have roads named in his honour.
8. The officers' club at the Army's Enoggera Barracks is named 'The Henry Dalziel VC Club'.
9. The Henry Dalziel VC Dialysis Centre, Greenslopes Private Hospital, Greenslopes, Queensland opened and named in his honour on 28 August 2003 by the Hon Danna Vale MP, Minister for Veterans Affairs and Minister Assisting the Minister for Defence.

== Notes ==
Footnotes

Citations
