= 31st Battalion, Royal Queensland Regiment =

Australian Army infantry battalion

- Cap badge of the Royal Queensland Regiment
- Active: 1881–2008
- Country: Queensland; Australia
- Allegiance: Queensland; Australia
- Branch: Queensland Defence Force; Australian Army Reserve
- Type: Infantry
- Role: Line infantry (formerly); Light infantry
- Size: Battalion
- Part of: 11th Brigade, 2nd Division
- Garrison/HQ: Jezzine Barracks, Townsville, Queensland
- Nickname: Kennedy Regiment
- Colours: Chocolate and gold
- March: John Peel
- Engagements: World War I: Western Front; World War II: Bougainville campaign

Insignia
- Unit colour patch

The 31st Battalion, Royal Queensland Regiment (31 RQR) was a Reserve infantry battalion of the Australian Army. Although it was officially formed as 31 RQR in 1965 the battalion can trace its lineage back to units formed in 1881 as part of the colonial defence forces of the state of Queensland.

Over the course of the unit's 127-year history, the unit has largely been used for home service, although it was awarded 42 battle honours. During the Second Boer War members from the battalion went to South Africa as part of the Queensland contingent, for which the battalion received its first battle honour. In 1914, the battalion was the first Australian infantry unit mobilised for service during World War I when it was sent to garrison Thursday Island after fears of possible German military action in the Pacific. Later many members of the battalion enlisted in the Australian Imperial Force (AIF), serving on the Western Front in France and Belgium. During World War II, the battalion was amalgamated with the 51st Battalion, Far North Queensland Regiment, initially serving as garrison troops in Dutch New Guinea before taking an active part in the fighting against the Japanese in the Bougainville campaign in 1944–45.

After the war the battalion underwent a number of changes in organisation and designation before 1965 when it was redesignated as the 31st Battalion, Royal Queensland Regiment. Since then the battalion has formed part of the 11th Brigade. In 1976, due to manpower shortages, the battalion was reduced to an independent rifle company before being re-raised as a full battalion again in 1986. In January 2008, the battalion was amalgamated with the 42nd Battalion, Royal Queensland Regiment (42 RQR) to form the 31st/42nd Battalion, Royal Queensland Regiment (31/42 RQR).

== History ==
=== Early years ===
31 RQR can trace its lineage back to units that were formed in Queensland in the mid to late 19th century. Around this time Queensland was separated from New South Wales and when British forces were withdrawn from Australia in the 1870s there was a need for the state to take responsibility for its own defence. In 1881, a number of Volunteer Independent Rifle Companies were raised at Charters Towers, Townsville and Ravenswood. In 1886, these companies were brought together to form the 3rd Queensland (Kennedy) Regiment, consisting of a number of volunteer companies and partially paid militia based in the North Military Region with its headquarters and two rifle companies based in Townsville, and three more rifle companies in Charters Towers, Ravenswood and then later at Mackay. The regimental title of the "Kennedy Regiment" was derived because the area in which the unit was raised had been explored largely by Edmund Kennedy in the mid-19th Century.

In 1899, the battalion was reorganised and the company at Mackay was converted to a mounted infantry unit. At the same time the 3rd Queensland (Kennedy) Regiment was brought up to an establishment of six companies, one each at Townsville, Ravenshoe and Cairns and three more at Charters Towers collocated with the battalion headquarters. At the same time Queensland raised a contingent to send to South Africa to contribute to the other Australian colonial forces being sent there to assist the British in fighting against the Boers. As a part of this force, many members of the 3rd Queensland (Kennedy) Regiment served as part of the first and second contingents of the Queensland Mounted Infantry. Due to their contribution to the Boer War, the Kennedy Regiment received its first battle honour and was presented with the King's Banner. The Queensland Defence Force was disbanded in 1903 and the colonial units were transferred to the Commonwealth Military Force under the control of the Federal government. At the same time the unit was reorganised as the 1st Battalion, Kennedy Regiment, with an establishment of four rifle companies. In 1912, with the establishment of a national compulsory service scheme the establishment was raised to include six companies and the unit's designation was changed, this time to the 2nd Infantry Battalion, Kennedy Regiment.

=== World War I ===
With the outbreak of World War I in August 1914, the Kennedy Regiment was the first Australian military unit mobilised when 500 men volunteered for overseas service and were sent to garrison Thursday Island due to concerns of German military action in the Pacific. This force then joined the Australian Naval and Military Expeditionary Force for the invasion of German New Guinea, however, when the task force reached Port Moresby, their commander, Colonel William Holmes decided to leave them there as garrison troops as it was felt that they were not ready for combat. The detachment was subsequently sent back to Townsville and subsequently played no further part in the war as it was decided not to deploy the militia units overseas, but rather to raise a separate force for overseas service known as the Australian Imperial Force. Despite this, many members of the Kennedy Regiment enlisted in the AIF, most of them, including the battalion's commanding officer Lieutenant Colonel Frederick Toll, joining the 31st Battalion which was raised at Enoggera in Brisbane as part of the 8th Brigade in August 1915.

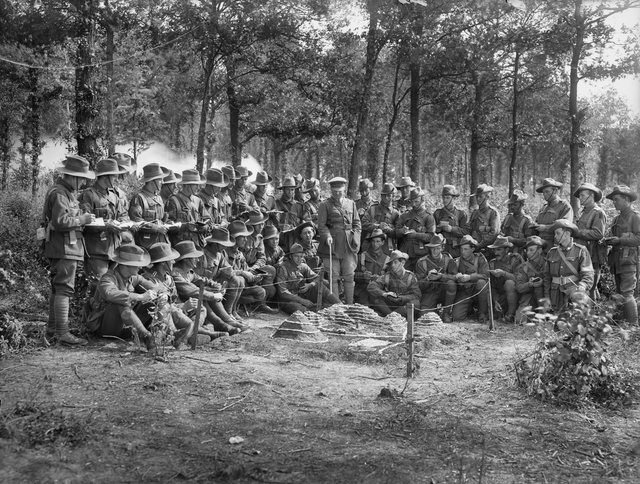
Members of the 8th Brigade, including soldiers from the 31st Battalion, AIF, undertaking a map reading class on the Somme in July 1918

The 31st Battalion, AIF, was formed with two companies from Queensland and two companies from Victoria and concentrated at Broadmeadows in Victoria before departing from Melbourne in October 1915. Initially, it was sent to Egypt where it was involved in the defence of the Suez Canal against the Turks, thus earning another battle honour—"Egypt 1915–16". Upon the battalion's arrival in Egypt, the 8th Brigade had been unattached at divisional level, but in early 1916, it was assigned to the 5th Division, after a reorganisation that saw the AIF expanded from two infantry divisions to five. In July 1916 the battalion arrived in France where its first involvement of war on the Western Front was the Battle of Fromelles, during which it suffered over 500 casualties and was so badly mauled that it undertook no more offensive action for the rest of the year. In 1917, the battalion was involved in the Allied advance towards the Hindenburg Line, although because it was employed mainly in the flank protection role in this time, the only major fighting that it was involved in was at Polygon Wood during the Battle of Passchendaele in the Ypres sector in September 1917. It was here that Private Patrick Joseph Bugden, an original member of the Kennedy Regiment, performed the actions that led to him receiving the Victoria Cross.

On 15 May 1918, Sergeant David Emmett Coyne was nominated for the Victoria Cross for throwing himself on a hand-grenade that he had thrown after it had accidentally bounced back off a parapet, in order to protect other soldiers. However, as this was not in the face of the enemy, the posthumous nomination was changed to that of the Albert Medal in Gold, the only such medal issued to a member of the AIF (it was later superseded by the George Cross). Later, in August 1918, the 31st Battalion was involved in the last Allied offensive of the war when it took part in the fighting that resulted in the capture of Villers Bretonneux and then Bullecourt. Later, in September, the battalion was involved in the attack on the St Quentin Canal. This proved to be their last involvement in the war as they were out of the line when the Armistice occurred on 11 November. The 31st Battalion, AIF, was disbanded in March 1919 while in France awaiting repatriation to Australia.

=== Inter war years ===
In April 1921, the AIF was officially disbanded and the following month the militia was reformed to perpetuate the designations and battle honours of the AIF. Consequently, the Kennedy Regiment was redesignated as the 31st Battalion (Kennedy Regiment). Upon reforming, the battalion drew personnel from a number of units, including the 31st and 49th Infantry Regiments, the 27th Light Horse, the 21st Australian Army Service Corps Company and the 7th Field Ambulance. During the interwar years the battalion's area of responsibility and organisation underwent a number of changes, but it was at this time that it became part of the 11th Brigade, which was headquartered around Brisbane, Queensland, and formed part of the 1st Military District.

In 1927, territorial designations were introduced and the 31st Battalion adopted the title of the "Kennedy Regiment". The battalion's motto – Semper Paratus Defendere – was also authorised at this time. At the outset, in 1921 the Citizen Forces units were maintained through a mixture of voluntary and compulsory service, but in late 1929, the scheme was suspended by the Scullin Labor government, and replaced by an all-volunteer "Militia" scheme. Due to the impact of the Great Depression and a general complacency towards matters relating to defence little was spent on the military during the 1930s and there were only a limited number of volunteers. As a result, by 1939, many of the battalion's subunits had been disbanded, although the unit managed to maintain its status as a battalion even though many other units were merged or disbanded in this time.

=== World War II ===
Upon the outbreak of World War II in September 1939, the 31st Battalion had subunits based all around northern Queensland including Townsville, Ayr, Home Hill, Bowen, Proserpine, Charters Towers and Ingham. As had been the case during World War I, it was decided to raise a separate force for overseas service, this time called the Second Australian Imperial Force and again many members of the battalion volunteered, while others continued to serve on a part-time basis. In this time, as part of the 2nd AIF, the 2/31st Battalion was raised, although this unit was considered separate from the 31st Battalion (Kennedy Regiment). In 1940 the battalion, along with the other units of the 11th Brigade—then composed of the 26th, 31st and 51st Battalions—was called up for a short period of training as a compulsory military service scheme as part of Australia's mobilisation during World War II and they went into camp near Bowen. Following Japan's entry into the war in late 1941 the militia were called up on to full-time service and the 11th Brigade began defensive duties in north Queensland. In early 1943, however, it was decided to release a certain number of men serving in the militia from their compulsory service due to a civilian manpower shortage that was threatening to impact upon the needs of the wartime economy. Consequently, when a large number of rural workers were released from the 31st and 51st Battalions, it was decided to amalgamate the two in April 1943.

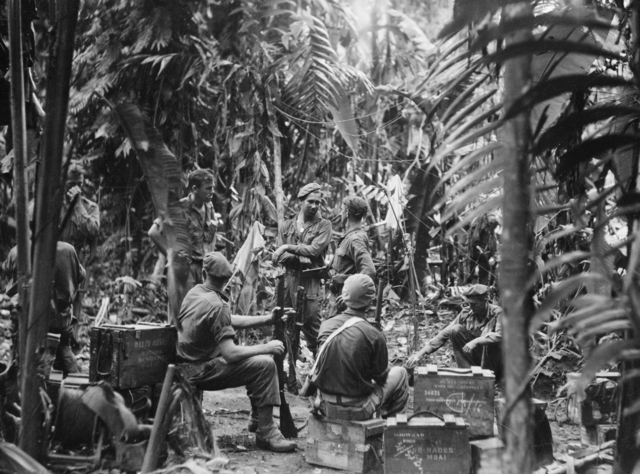
Men from the 31st/51st Battalion about to go out on patrol around Porton Plantation, 9 June 1945

In June 1943, after undertaking amphibious training with the Americans, the 31st/51st Battalion (Kennedy and Far North Queensland Regiment) became a part of Merauke Force and were sent to Dutch Western New Guinea to carry out garrison duties, earning the distinction of being the first Australian militia unit to serve outside of Australian territory. (Note: Due to provisions of the Defence Act 1903 the government was not allowed to send militia units outside of Australian territory, which at the time included New Guinea as it had become an Australian mandated territory following the end of World War I. This was later changed, by the Defence (Citizen Military Forces) Act 1943 to allow militia units to serve throughout the South West Pacific Area.) In July 1944 the battalion was gazetted as an AIF unit. Later, in August 1944, after being deployed for over a year, they were withdrawn back to Australia and after a period of leave and re-organisation, the 11th Brigade was deployed to Bougainville in the Solomon Islands, arriving there in December 1944.

For the next ten months until Japan's surrender the 31st/51st Battalion took part in a long and costly campaign and suffered a total of 229 casualties, including 61 killed in action. Responsible for the northern and central sectors of the island, the battalion initially advanced along the north-east coast, occupying a number of villages, however they did not experience their first action until they crossed the Genga River and attempted to move up the Tsimba Ridge on 17 January 1944, when they came finally in contact with the Japanese. The Japanese had dug in along the ridge and heavily fortified it with bunkers and mutually supporting machine gun pits and it was only after twenty-one days of continuous fighting that the 31st/51st finally carried the position. After this the battalion carried out a number of patrols throughout the northern sector, before being relieved for a rest out of the line. This rest did not last very long, however, as a company from the 31st/51st were called upon to carry out an amphibious landing at Porton, as the rest of the battalion advanced further north from the line that had been set up at Ratsua–Ruri. The landing occurred on 7 June, however, the company was quickly surrounded by the Japanese and as the rest of the battalion attempted to break through to them, they were evacuated by sea. This brief second campaign on Bougainville lasted until 28 June when the 11th Brigade was relieved by the 23rd Brigade. During this time the 31st/51st had suffered 100 casualties, consisting of seven missing, 14 killed and 79 wounded.

The battalion took no further part in the fighting and after the Japanese surrender the battalion was moved to Nauru and Ocean Island to carry out garrison duties where they remained until December 1945 when they were transferred to Rabaul on New Britain. They remained there as an occupation force until May 1946 when the unit returned to Australia, where the 31st/51st Battalion (Kennedy and Far North Queensland Regiment) was disbanded on 4 July 1946. For their involvement during World War II, members of the 31st/51st Battalion received 43 decorations, including: one Distinguished Service Order, one Distinguished Conduct Medal, three Military Crosses, ten Military Medals, one British Empire Medal and 27 Mentions in Despatches.

=== Post World War II ===
After World War II the militia units were re-formed as part of the Citizens Military Force (CMF) and subsequently the battalion was re-raised in 1948, this time as the 31st Battalion, North Queensland Regiment. John Peel was approved as the battalion's regimental march in 1953. In 1960, the battalion's designation was changed again when it was decided to introduce the Pentropic organisation into the Australian Army, a part of which required the reorganisation of the regionally based CMF battalions into six State based regiments. As a result of this the battalion became the 2nd Battalion, Royal Queensland Regiment. The battalion received its World War II battle honours in 1961, and was entrusted with those earned by the 2/31st Battalion at the same time. In 1965, the Australian Army moved away from the Pentropic organisation and returned to the previous establishment and it was decided to return to the CMF battalions to their previous numerical designations. This saw the battalion finally become the 31st Battalion, Royal Queensland Regiment. During this time the battalion's numbers fluctuated as national service was suspended in 1960, reintroduced in 1965 and then finally abolished in late 1972. Finally the strength of the unit declined to the extent that it was reduced to a company-sized element and was subsequently renamed as the 31st Independent Rifle Company in 1976. On 30 October 1986 the unit regained battalion status and it was reformed once more as the 31st Battalion, Royal Queensland Regiment.

In 2006, the decision was made to re-organise the Brisbane-based 7th Brigade to make it a fully Regular unit. Subsequently, the two Reserve infantry battalions based at Enoggera, the 9th and 25th/49th Battalions, Royal Queensland Regiment, were re-allocated to the 11th Brigade in July 2007. As a result of this, it was decided to amalgamate the two existing battalions of the 11th Brigade, so that the brigade could maintain the traditional three battalion structure. As such, on 1 January 2008, 31 RQR was amalgamated with 42 RQR to form the 31st/42nd Battalion, Royal Queensland Regiment.

== Lineage ==
The following list details the lineage of 31 RQR.

1881–1886 — Independent Rifle Companies
1886–1903 — 3rd Queensland (Kennedy) Regiment
1903–1912 — 1st Battalion, Kennedy Regiment
1912–1921 — 2nd Infantry Battalion, Kennedy Regiment
1921–1943 — 31st Battalion (Kennedy Regiment), AMF
1943–1946 — 31st/51st Battalion (Kennedy and Far North Queensland Regiment), AIF
1948–1960 — 31st Battalion, North Queensland Regiment
1960–1965 — 'C' Coy, 2nd Battalion, Royal Queensland Regiment
1965–1976 — 31st Battalion, Royal Queensland Regiment
1976–1986 — 31st Independent Rifle Company
1986–2008 — 31st Battalion, Royal Queensland Regiment

== Battle honours ==
The 31st Battalion, Royal Queensland Regiment, received 42 battle honours. The first battle honour of South Africa 1899–1902 was bestowed upon the regiment due to the involvement of many men from the Kennedy Regiment in the first and second contingents of the Queensland Mounted Infantry. During World War I, the 31st Battalion, AIF, received 16 battle honours, which were later passed to the 31st Battalion when it was re-raised as a militia battalion in 1921. The 31st/51st Battalion earned five battle honours during World War II, while the 2/31st Battalion earned another 22, which were later passed to the Kennedy Regiment in 1948. (Note: Of the 22 battle honours earned by the 2/31st Battalion, two (Liberation of Australian New Guinea and South-West Pacific 1942–45) were also awarded to the 31st/51st, hence the battalion received only 25 distinct battle honours for World War II.)

- Boer War: South Africa 1899–1902.
- World War I: Egypt 1915–16, Somme 1916–18, Bapaume 1917, Bullecourt, Ypres 1917, Menin Road, Polygon Wood, Poelcappelle, Passchendaele, Ancre 1918, Amiens, Albert 1918, Mont St Quentin, Hindenburg Line, St Quentin Canal, France and Flanders 1916–18.
- World War II: Tsimba Ridge, Bonis–Porton, South-West Pacific 1942–45, Liberation of Australian New Guinea, Syria 1941, Syrian Frontier, Merjayun, Jezzine, Damour, Hill 1069, Baradene, South-West Pacific 1942–1945, Kokoda Trail, Ioribaiwa, Eora Creek–Templeton's Crossing II, Oivi–Gorari, Buna–Gona, Gona, Lae–Nadzab, Lae Road, Ramu Valley, Shaggy Ridge, Borneo 1945, Balikpapan, Milford Highway.

== Popular culture ==
In 1916, while at Thursday Island, Fred Affoo composed the Kennedy Regiment Waltz in honour of Colonel Robert Beveridge Huxtable, who commanded the regiment at Thursday Island.

== See also ==
- Military history of Australia
- Military history of Australia during World War I
- Military history of Australia during World War II
- Royal Queensland Regiment

== Notes ==
Footnotes

Citations
