= 31st/42nd Battalion, Royal Queensland Regiment =

Australian Army infantry battalion

- Active: 2008–Present
- Country: Australia
- Allegiance: Commonwealth of Australia
- Branch: Australian Army Reserve
- Type: Infantry
- Role: Light infantry
- Size: Battalion
- Part of: 11th Brigade, 2nd Division
- Garrison/HQ: Lavarack Barracks, Townsville
- Mottos: Pro Aris Et Focis (For Altars and Hearths)

Commanders
- Current Commander: LTCOL David Gandy (Since January 2021)

Insignia
- Unit colour patch
- Abbreviation: 31/42 RQR

The 31st/42nd Battalion, Royal Queensland Regiment (31/42 RQR) is a Reserve infantry battalion of the Australian Army. One of three battalions of the Royal Queensland Regiment, it was formed in early 2008 through the amalgamation of the 31st Battalion, Royal Queensland Regiment and the 42nd Battalion, Royal Queensland Regiment, 31/42 RQR draws its personnel from various locations in Northern and Central Queensland and currently forms part of the 11th Brigade.

== History ==
The battalion was formed in January 2008 by the amalgamation of two previously existing infantry battalions: the 31st Battalion, Royal Queensland Regiment and the 42nd Battalion, Royal Queensland Regiment. Through its predecessor units, 31/42 RQR has a long history, and can trace its lineage back to units formed in 1881 as part of the colonial defence forces of the state of Queensland. These units were mainly used in home defence duties, although during the Second Boer War and World War I many of their members volunteered for overseas service and by virtue of this service battle honours from these wars were bestowed upon these units.

During World War II, both of these units were called upon to play an active role in the fighting in the Pacific, thus earning more battle honours for themselves. After the war, these units were disbanded and then reformed as part of the Citizens Military Force in 1948, which was a forerunner to the current Australian Army Reserve, and as a part of that organisation both 31 and 42 RQR continued to exist in various forms for the next 60 years before it was decided to amalgamate the two units early in 2008.

Headquartered in Townsville, Queensland, 31/42 RQR has a number of depots throughout Central and Northern Queensland, from Gladstone to Cairns. 31/42 RQR forms part of the 11th Brigade.

== Alliances ==
- United Kingdom – once The Black Watch (Royal Highland Regiment) – now Royal Regiment of Scotland - via 42nd Battalion & RQR

== See also ==
- Military history of Australia
- Military history of Australia during World War I
- Military history of Australia during World War II
