= 11th Brigade (Australia) =

Australian Army reserve brigade

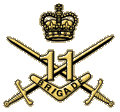
- 11 Brigade insignia
- Active: 1912–present
- Country: Australia
- Branch: Australian Army
- Type: Reserve
- Size: 100 (regular); 2,700 (reserve); 50 (civilian)
- Part of: 2nd Division
- Headquarters: Townsville

Commanders
- Notable commanders: James Cannan; John Stevenson

Insignia
- Unit colour patch

The 11th Brigade is an Australian Army brigade which currently comprises most Australian Army Reserve units located in Queensland. The brigade was first formed in early 1912 following the introduction of the compulsory training scheme. Later, as part of the 3rd Division and saw action during World War I on the Western Front as part of the First Australian Imperial Force. In the interwar years, the brigade was re-raised with its headquarters in Brisbane.

During World War II, it undertook garrison and defensive duties in north Queensland before deploying to Dutch New Guinea in 1943. In 1944–1945, the brigade took part in the fighting against the Japanese on Bougainville. In the postwar era, the 11th Brigade was raised and disbanded several times, before being raised in Townsville in 1987, where its headquarters is currently located. It forms part of the 2nd Division, and consists of units based across Queensland and New South Wales.

== History ==
=== Formation and World War I ===
The 11th Brigade traces its origins to 1912, when it was formed as a Militia brigade as part of the introduction of the compulsory training scheme, assigned to the 2nd Military District. The brigade's constituent units were spread across various locations in New South Wales including Penrith, Lithgow, Bathurst, Orange, Parkes, Dubbo, Liverpool, Goulburn, Wagga Wagga and Albury.

During World War I, the 11th Brigade was raised in early 1916 as part of the First Australian Imperial Force. Forming part of the 3rd Division, the brigade was formed in Australia during the period shortly after the Gallipoli Campaign when the AIF was being expanded prior to its commitment to the fighting on the Western Front. On formation, the brigade consisted of four infantry battalions: the 41st, 42nd, 43rd and 44th.

Of these, the first two were drawn from Queensland, while the 43rd was recruited mainly from South Australia and the 44th came from Western Australia. In addition to these battalions, the brigade was supported by the 11th Field Ambulance, the 11th Trench Mortar Battery and the 11th Machine Gun Company (later part of the 3rd Machine Gun Battalion).

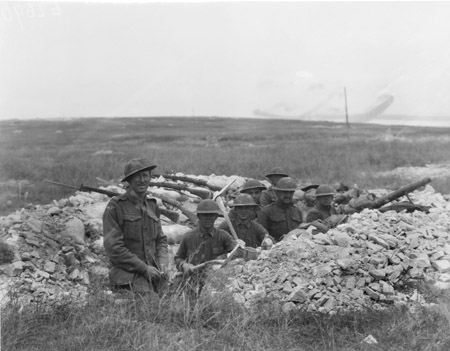
Australian troops from the 11th Brigade, with US troops, during the Battle of Hamel, July 1918

Following the brigade's establishment, a brief period of training was undertaken in Queensland until May 1916 when the formation embarked for the United Kingdom where they concentrated with other elements of the 3rd Division in the Salisbury Plain Training Area for further training after July 1916. There, they undertook further training until November that year, when the troops of the 3rd Division began moving across the Channel to the Western Front.

The brigade's first commander was Brigadier General Colin Rankin. He was replaced by Brigadier General James Cannan in December 1916. Following its commitment to the Western Front, the 11th Brigade took part in many battles over the course of the next two years. These include: the Third Battle of Ypres, the Battle of Broodseinde, the Battle of Passchendaele, the Second Battle of Morlancourt, the Battle of Hamel and the Hundred Days Offensive.

=== Militia and interwar period ===
While the AIF was deployed, a separate Citizens Force (later known as the Militia) formation remained in Australia. By 1918, an 11th Brigade had been established within the 2nd Military District, consisting of the 41st (Blue Mountains), 42nd (Lachlan-Macquarie), 43rd (Werriwa), and 44th (Riverina) Infantry Battalions. The AIF was formally disbanded in 1921, at which time it was decided to reorganise the Citizens Force to perpetuate the numerical designations of the AIF.

Forming part of the 1st Military District, the 11th Brigade was based in north Queensland at this time, with its headquarters in Brisbane. It was raised as a mixed brigade and included one light horse regiment: the 2nd, based in Ipswich. In 1928, the brigade consisted of the 9th, 31st, 42nd and 47th Battalions.

By 1938, the brigade had been expanded and along with its infantry units it also included light horse regiments that had previously been assigned to the 1st Cavalry Brigade: these were the 2nd/14th, 5th and 11th, which were spread across depots in Brisbane and further afield in south-east Queensland such as Goondiwindi and Kingaroy.

=== World War II ===
At the outbreak of World War II, the 11th Brigade consisted of four Queensland-based infantry battalions: the 26th (Hughenden), 31st (Townsville), 42nd (Rockhampton) and 51st (Cairns). The early war years saw the brigade undertake short periods of continuous service to provide training to part-time soldiers called up under the compulsory service scheme. In December 1941, at the outset of the war in the Pacific, the brigade was called up for full time service, and was allocated to the defence of northern Queensland. During this time, they were engaged with improving camp infrastructure, building defences and individual and collective training.

Later, the brigade was reorganised into a triangular formation, and the 42nd Battalion was transferred to the 29th Brigade. In early 1943, the brigade became part of the 4th Division. The 31st and 51st Battalions were merged, forming the 31st/51st Battalion, following a government decision to release some personnel back to war essential civilian industries. The brigade was later reinforced by the 20th Motor Regiment, for a brief period between April and August 1944, before the 55th/53rd Battalion joined the brigade in August 1944.

In the intervening period, the 11th Brigade, after amphibious warfare training, deployed to Merauke in Dutch New Guinea, under the command of Brigadier John Stevenson. There, the brigade provided a garrison to defend the area in case of Japanese attack. In deploying to Merauke, the brigade became the only Militia formation to deploy outside Australian territory during the war.

As the war progressed, the threat to Merauke reduced as the Allies advanced north through New Guinea. As a result, the brigade was withdrawn from Merauke in August 1944, and after a period of leave concentrated at Strathpine, Queensland, where they undertook further training. In December 1944, the brigade deployed to Bougainville, where Australian troops had taken over from US forces, which were subsequently redeployed to the Philippines.

The 11th Brigade relieved the US 148th Infantry Regiment, and subsequently took part operations in the northern and central parts of the island. Following its deployment in Bougainville, the brigade was assigned to the II Army Corps. During this time, the brigade's three infantry battalions alternated between holding actions in the central sector, and the advance in the north. Several notable actions were fought at Tsimba Ridge and Porton Plantation before the 11th Brigade was relieved by the 23rd Brigade in June 1945.

The brigade was moved back to Torokina after this, remaining there until the end of the war. In September 1945, the brigade was assigned to the 11th Division and moved to Rabaul to carry out garrison duties.

=== Army Reserve ===
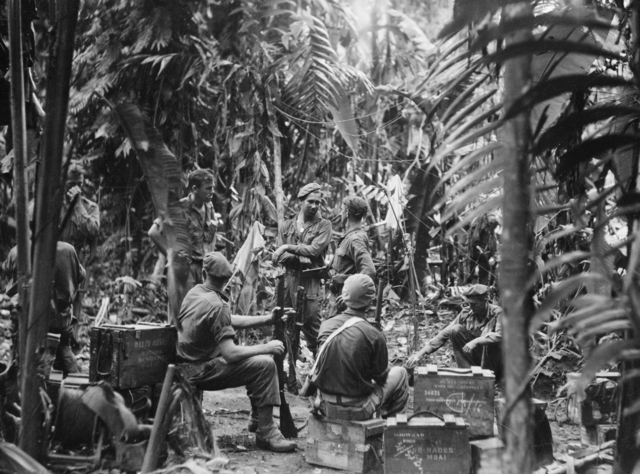
Men from the 31st/51st Battalion about to go out on patrol around Porton Plantation, Bougainville, 9 June 1945

Following the war, the wartime military was demobilised and the part-time Citizens Military Force was formed in 1948. In the post-war period, the 11th Brigade was raised, disbanded and redesignated several times. After being re-formed in the immediate post war years, it was assigned to Northern Command in 1953.

The brigade was disbanded in 1960. It was re-raised in 1972 as the 11th Task Force, before being renamed the 11th Field Force Group in 1977. The brigade was re-established in 1987, based in Townsville. At this time, the brigade was tasked with vital asset protection in northern Australia in the event of war.

In 2000, the brigade was allocated an area of responsibility including Cape York Peninsula. In July 2007, a re-organisation of the 7th Brigade saw the transfer of the Brisbane-based 9th Battalion, Royal Queensland Regiment and the 25th/49th Battalion, Royal Queensland Regiment to the 11th Brigade. At the same time, the brigade was transferred from the 1st Division to the 2nd. In July 2008, the 31st and 42nd Battalions merged to form the 31st/42nd Battalion, Royal Queensland Regiment.

Under Plan Beersheba, the brigade is tasked with generating a battlegroup in support of the 3rd Brigade, one year in every three. The battlegroup is known as Battlegroup Cannan. While the majority of the brigade's units are based in Queensland, headquartered either in Townsville or Brisbane, its cavalry unit, the 12th/16th Hunter River Lancers, is based in Tamworth.

Between October 2010 and June 2011, a composite company designated "ANZAC Company", formed from 11th Brigade Reservists deployed to Timor Leste under Operation Astute. The brigade led recovery efforts following Tropical Cyclone Marcia in early 2015, providing a Reserve response force at short notice from elements of 31/42 RQR, the 11th Combat Service Support Battalion and the 35th Field Squadron.

== Organisation ==
As of 2026 the 11th Brigade consists of the following units:

- Headquarters 11th Brigade (HQ 11 Bde) – Brisbane
- 9th Battalion, Royal Queensland Regiment (9 RQR) – Brisbane
- 25th/49th Battalion, Royal Queensland Regiment (25/49 RQR) – Greenbank
- 31st/42nd Battalion, Royal Queensland Regiment (31/42 RQR) – Townsville
- 12th/16th Hunter River Lancers – Tamworth/ Caboolture
- 11th Engineer Regiment (11 ER) – Brisbane
- 11th Combat Service Support Battalion (11 CSSB) – Brisbane
