= Shrapnel Valley Cemetery =

World War I cemetery in Turkey

Shrapnel Valley
- Commonwealth War Graves Commission
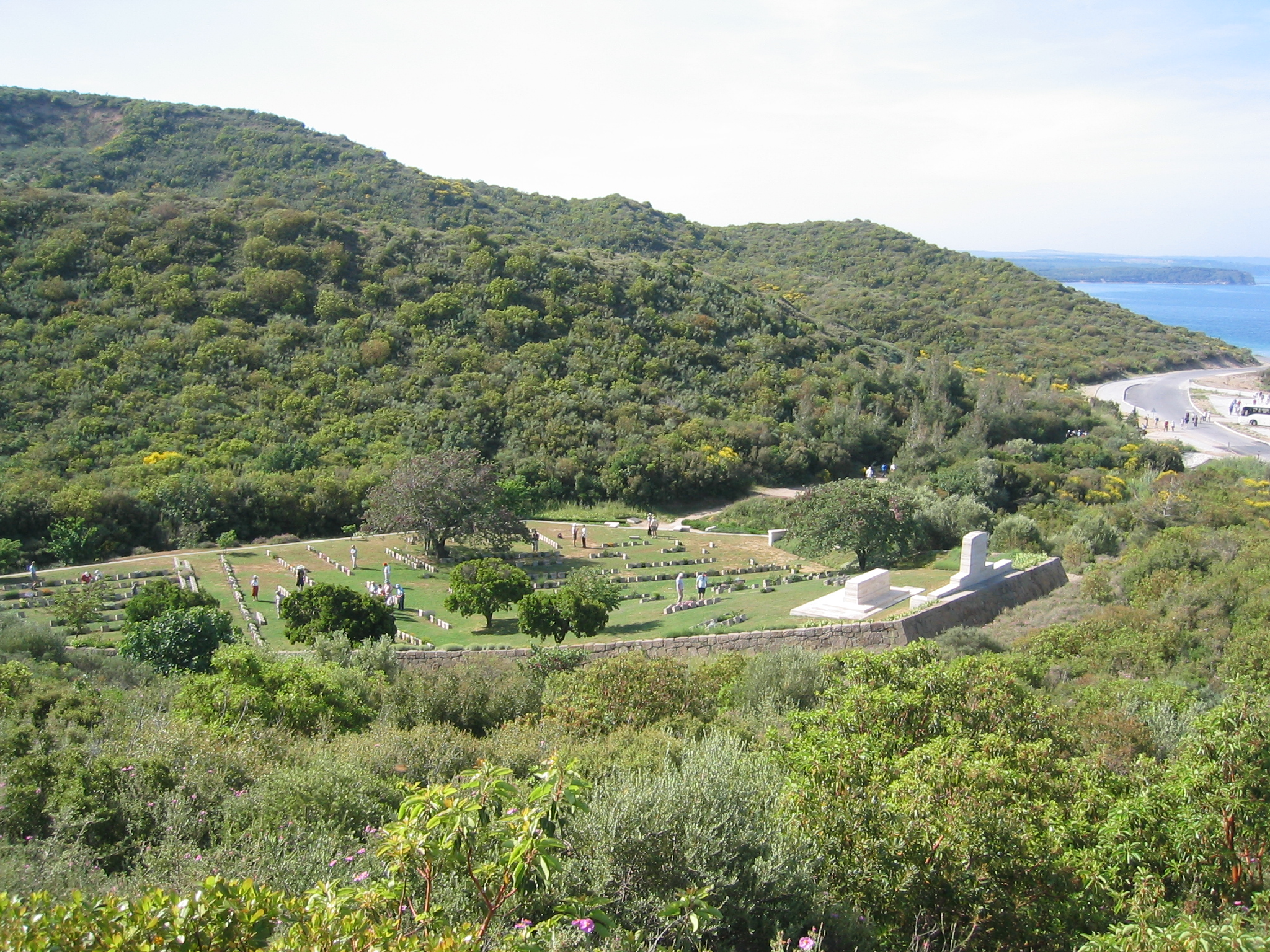
- Used for those deceased April 1915 – January 1916
- Established: 1915
- Location: 40.2341°N 26.2784°E near Gallipoli, Turkey
- Total burials: 683
- Unknowns: 85

Burials by nation
- Allied Powers: Australian: 527; New Zealand: 56; British: 28

Burials by war
- World War I: 683

Shrapnel Valley Cemetery is a cemetery from World War I and is the second largest Commonwealth War Graves Commission Cemetery in the former Anzac sector of the Gallipoli Peninsula, Turkey, after Lone Pine Cemetery.

== History ==
The battles at Gallipoli, some of whose participating soldiers are buried at this cemetery, was an eight-month campaign fought by Commonwealth and French forces against Ottoman Empire forces in an attempt to force the Ottoman Empire out of the war, which it was hoped would relieve the deadlock of the Western Front and to open a supply route between Russia and the Mediterranean through the Dardanelles and the Black Sea.

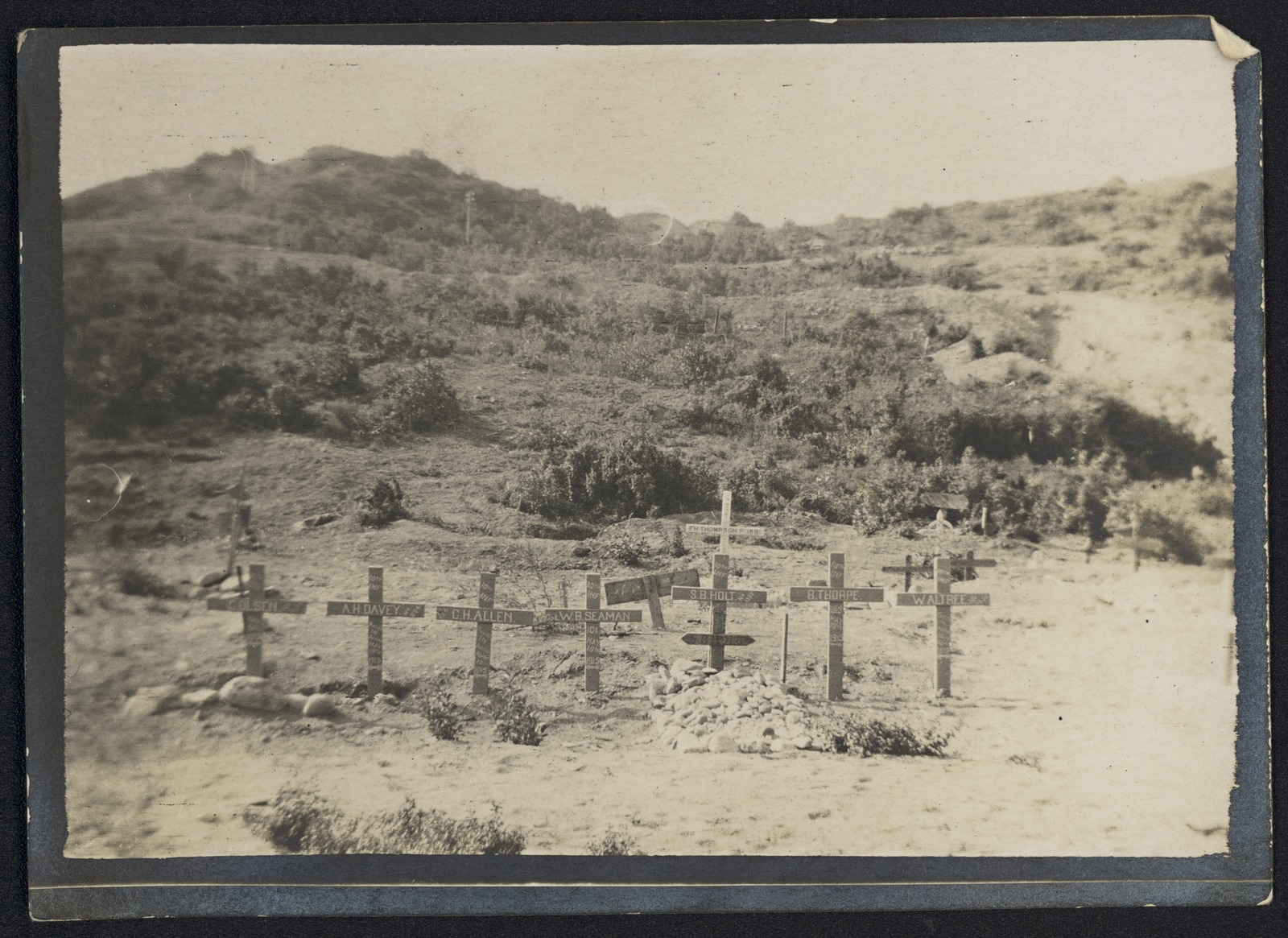
Shrapnel Valley Cemetery Gallipoli Turkey (1915) Pte Victor Laidlaw State Library Victoria H84.356/37

Following the landing at Anzac Cove in April 1915, Shrapnel Valley (or Shrapnel Gully) became the main route for Allied troops and supplies between the beach and the frontline in the Anzac sector. Falling shrapnel made a distinctive whistling before striking the area. It was during the battles in the early days of the campaign that the name for the gully was coined. Later, several wells were dug in the valley and camps and gun emplacements constructed in the lower end.

On the night of 18 to 19 May 1915, the 5th Light Horse Regiment from Queensland began an offensive through the valley.

The cemetery is a trapezoidal shaped area larger than an average city block. It was in use during the campaign, and some additional graves were moved from outlying sites into it after the war.

Private Victor Laidlaw photographed the cemetery in 1915 and made this comment in his diary:

4.7.15 (4 July 1915) The military cemetery near us is gradually expanding, every day you will see a small party witnessing the last call of a comrade who has gone to rest, crude graves some of them are, but they are looked after as much as possible. A good number have large crosses on them, while others are quite nameless, still all honour to these Australian heroes who have fallen here.

== Major Quinn buried at Shrapnel Valley ==
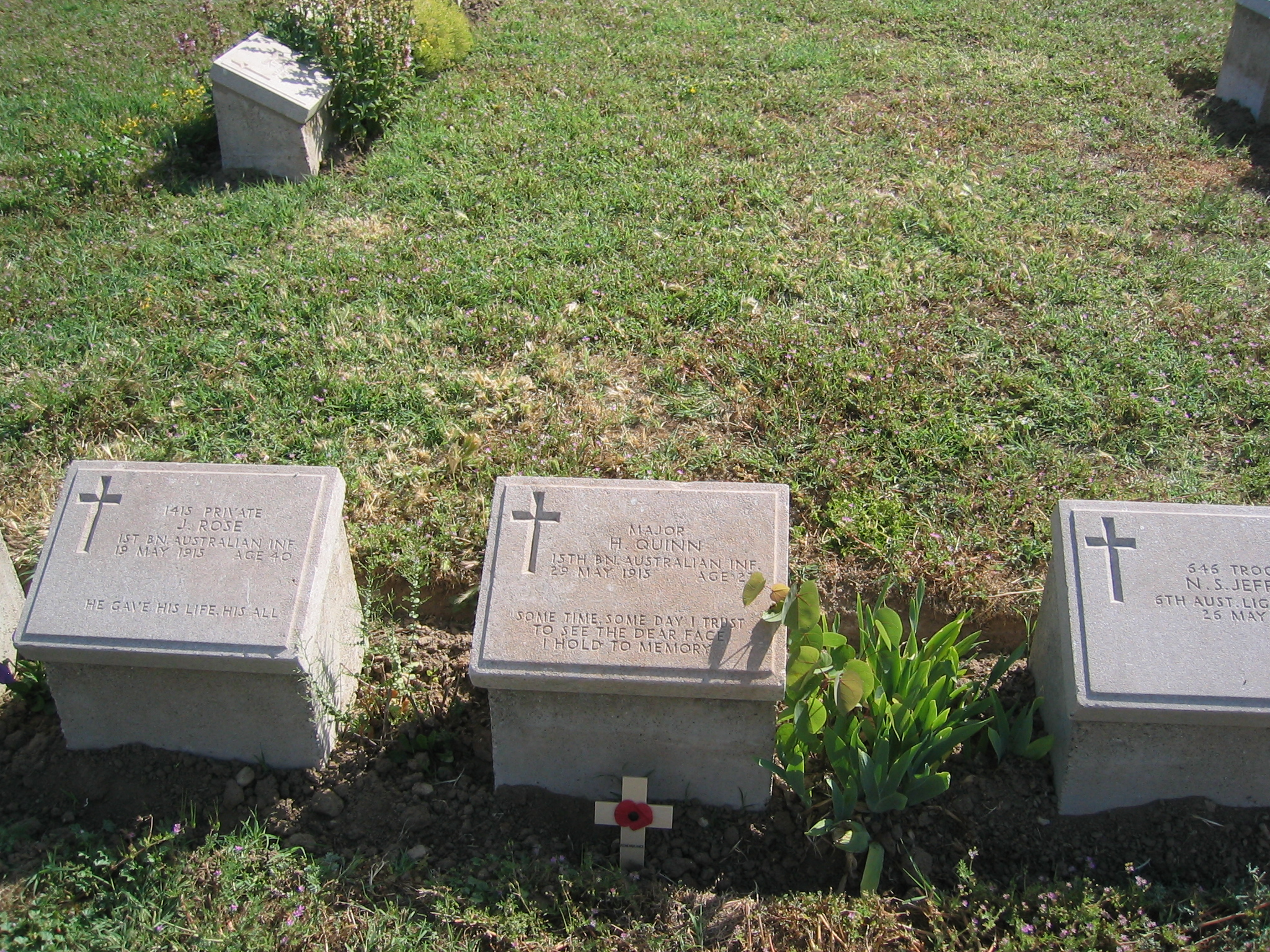
Major Hugh Quinn's grave marker (centre)

Amongst the burials is that of Major Hugh Quinn, after whom Quinn's Post was named, now the location of Quinn's Post Cemetery. Ironically, Major Quinn is not buried in the cemetery which bears his name.

Captain Quinn was in command of C company, 15th Battalion of the First Australian Imperial Force (AIF), and detailed on 29 April 1915 to hold the precarious position which had been established a few days before. He was promoted to major on 1 May but was shot on 29 May whilst reconnoitring in daylight for a counter-attack to expel Turkish troops from positions nearby seized during an assault on the post.

== Location ==
The Anzac cemeteries are reached from the left hand junction of the Eceabat – Bigali Road. After 10.1 km from the junction, there is a right turn along a short track to find the cemetery on the left.
