= 42nd Battalion (Australia) =

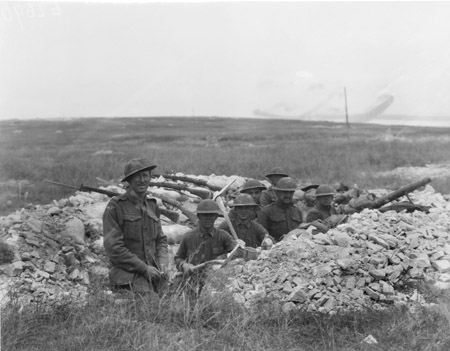
- Australian troops from the 42nd Battalion with American soldiers, during the Battle of Hamel in 1918.
- Active: 1915–2008
- Country: Australia
- Branch: Australian Army
- Type: Infantry
- Part of: 11th Brigade, 3rd Division; 29th Brigade, 5th Division; 11th Brigade, 2nd Division
- Motto: Cede Nullis (Yield To None)
- March: Blue Bonnets Over the Border
- Engagements: First World War: Battle of Messines (1917); Battle of Broodseinde; Battle of Passchendaele; Battle of Amiens (1918); Battle of Hamel; Battle of Mont Saint-Quentin; Second World War: Salamaua–Lae campaign; Bougainville campaign

Commanders
- Notable commanders: Charles Davidson

Insignia
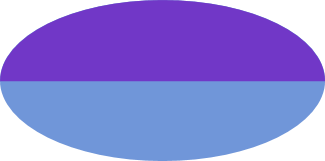
- Unit colour patch

The 42nd Battalion was an infantry battalion of the Australian Army. Raised as part of the Australian Imperial Force (AIF) during the First World War, it was established at Enoggera in December 1915, forming part of the 11th Brigade in the 3rd Division. It subsequently served on the Western Front in France and Belgium in 1916–18 before being disbanded on 22 October 1918. In 1921, the battalion was reformed as part of the Citizens Forces becoming known as the 42nd Battalion (Capricornia Regiment). Following the outbreak of the Second World War the battalion held a number of training exercises and camps until 1941, before being mobilised in March 1942 as part of the 29th Brigade, in the 5th Division. It subsequently served in New Guinea fighting against the Japanese during 1943–44 and on Bougainville in 1945, before being disbanded on 7 May 1946. In 1948, it was reformed as part of the re-raised Citizens Military Forces. Today, its lineage is perpetuated by the 31st/42nd Battalion, Royal Queensland Regiment, a unit which continues to serve in the Australian Army Reserve.

== History ==
=== First World War ===
The 42nd Battalion was raised at Enoggera near Brisbane, Queensland, in December 1915 as part of the Australian Imperial Force (AIF) during the First World War. Due to sharing its numerical designation with the famous Scottish regiment, the battalion became known as the "Australian Black Watch". Under the command of Lieutenant Colonel Arthur Woolcock the battalion was part of the 11th Brigade of the 3rd Division, which was formed in Australia as part of an expansion of the AIF following the Gallipoli campaign. After completing training in Australia and Britain the battalion deployed to France on 26 November 1916 to fight against German forces on the Western Front, taking up positions on the frontline in December where it endured the winter of 1916–17, as well as completing further training and labouring tasks in the rear areas when not in the line.

During 1917 the 3rd Division operated in the Ypres sector in Belgium, with the battalion taking part in the battle at Messines in June, Warneton in late July, Broodseinde in early October, and then at Passchendaele on 12 October where it sustained heavy casualties, mainly due to German gas attacks. The battalion remained in Belgium for the following five months, rotating between the front and rear areas. In March 1918, it moved to France to help blunt the German spring offensive, repelling a German attack around Morlancourt. During the lull that followed, the battalion was subsequently involved in the Battle of Hamel on 4 July 1918. When the Allies launched their own offensive in August, the 42nd Battalion was involved in the initial attack around Amiens and then the subsequent advance that followed as the Allies attempted to penetrate the Hindenburg Line. Its final involvement in the fighting came during the fighting at St Quentin Canal during the period 29 September to 2 October. After this, the Australian Corps was withdrawn from the line for rest and reorganisation, and the 42nd Battalion was disbanded on 22 October 1918 to provide reinforcements for other AIF units, which had suffered heavy casualties throughout the year. During its service the battalion sustained a total of 544 killed and 1,450 wounded. The battalion's last man (of 2,954), Sergeant Robert S. Melloy, died on 23 January 1995, at age 97.

=== Inter-war years ===
In 1921, after the demobilisation of the AIF was completed, Australia's part-time military force, the Citizens Forces (later the "Militia"), was reorganised to perpetuate the numerical designations of the AIF. As a result, the battalion was reformed as a part-time unit, drawing lineage and personnel from the 2nd Battalion, 42nd Infantry Regiment and elements of the 9th, 47th and 52nd Infantry Regiments. In 1927, when territorial designations were introduced, the battalion became known as the 42nd Battalion (Capricornia Regiment). It also adopted the motto of Cede Nullius. With its men mainly recruited from Sarina, Carmilla, and Yeppoon in Central Queensland, it had training centres in Rockhampton, Mount Morgan, and briefly also in Gladstone and Mackay. From 1937 to 1939 the battalion was commanded by Lieutenant Colonel James Martin.

=== Second World War ===
Following the outbreak of the Second World War the battalion held a number of training exercises and camps at Yeppoon until 1941, as the Militia battalions were tasked with improving the nation's readiness for war. During this time the battalion was commanded by Lieutenant Colonel Alexander Heron, who had taken up command of the battalion in January 1940. In March 1942, as the threat posed by the Japanese in the Pacific grew, the battalion was mobilised for full-time service and moved to Tiaro. There, it concentrated with the 15th and 47th Battalions to form the 29th Brigade, 5th Division. In early 1942, the 29th Brigade moved to Townsville and was tasked with preparing defensive positions between Giru and Rollingstone in case of a Japanese invasion. It later conducted jungle warfare training at Mount Spec, near Townsville. Lieutenant Colonel Charles Davidson took over as commanding officer in September 1942. In January 1943, the brigade was deployed to Milne Bay in New Guinea to take part in operations against the Japanese. The battalion subsequently moved to Buna and Boisi in mid-July, before moving again to Morobe. In August, the 42nd Battalion moved to Nassau Bay, then redeployed to Tambu Bay, fighting during the Salamaua–Lae campaign around Mount Tambu. On 9 September, it secured Charlie Hill, subsequently allowing the capture of Salamaua three days later. In early 1944, the 29th Brigade was involved in clearing the Japanese from Lae alongside the 7th Division. In August, the battalion returned to Australia after 18 months on operations, encamping at Young's Crossing in Petrie, Queensland, for reorganisation after a period of leave. Lieutenant Colonel Joseph Byrne took over as commanding officer in September 1944.

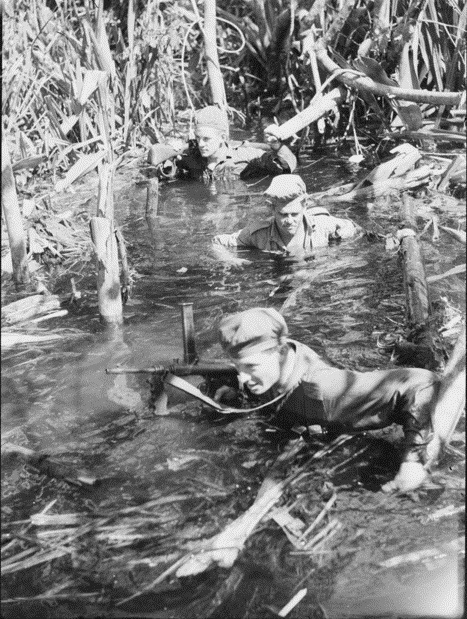
A patrol from the 42nd Battalion on Bougainville, January 1945.

The battalion was subsequently redeployed to Bougainville in December 1944, with the 29th Brigade becoming part of the 3rd Division. Initially deployed in the Southern Sector, the 29th Brigade commenced operations with the 15th Battalion conducting the initial advance down the coast from the Jaba River to the Tavera. The remainder of the brigade, including the 42nd Battalion, commenced operations in January 1945. Entering the abandoned village of Mawaraka on 17 January, the battalion occupied it and then began patrolling forward, frequently clashing with Japanese forces amid the swamps in the area. The 29th Brigade was subsequently relieved by the 7th Brigade and returned to Torokina. In July the 29th Brigade relieved the 15th Brigade along the Mivo River, with the 42nd Battalion taking up positions along the Buin Road, between the Mobiai River and Nana Creek. Meeting strong resistance the brigade advance was held up; however, the Japanese were subsequently cleared and the Silibai River captured on 10 July. The 42nd Battalion subsequently established patrol bases on the Mivo, reaching the Oamai River by the end of July. Hostilities came to an end in August following the Japanese surrender and the demobilisation process began. The 42nd Battalion was disbanded on 7 May 1946. The battalion lost a total of 27 killed and 55 wounded.

=== Post-war ===
In 1948, the 42nd Infantry Battalion, The Capricornia Regiment was reformed as part of the re-raised Citizens Military Forces (CMF), with three companies in Rockhampton and its headquarters in Maryborough. In 1960, with the introduction of the Pentropic division into the Australian Army, the CMF was reorganised with the 42nd Battalion was absorbed into the 2nd Battalion, Royal Queensland Regiment (RQR), forming D and E Companies. In 1965, following the abandonment of the Pentropic divisional structure, the 42nd Battalion was re-raised as a full battalion of The Royal Queensland Regiment when 2 RQR was split, with its headquarters, a rifle company, administration company and support company at Rockhampton, a rifle company at Mackay and another rifle company at Gladstone. In 2008, 42 RQR merged with the 31st Battalion, Royal Queensland Regiment, to become the 31st/42nd Battalion, Royal Queensland Regiment as part of the 11th Brigade in the Australian Army Reserve.

== Alliances ==
The 42nd Battalion held the following alliances:

- United Kingdom – The Black Watch.

== Battle honours ==
The 42nd Battalion received the following battle honours:

- First World War: Messines, 1917; Ypres, 1917; Polygon Wood; Broodseinde; Poelcappelle; Passchendaele; Somme, 1918; Ancre, 1918; Hamel; Amiens; Albert, 1918; Mont St. Quentin; Hindenburg Line; St. Quentin Canal; and France and Flanders, 1916–18.
- Second World War: Mount Tambu; South-West Pacific 1943–45; Tambu Bay; Komiatum; Liberation of Australian New Guinea; Mawaraka; and Mivo Ford.
