= Patrick Bugden =

Australian recipient of the Victoria Cross

Patrick Joseph Bugden VC
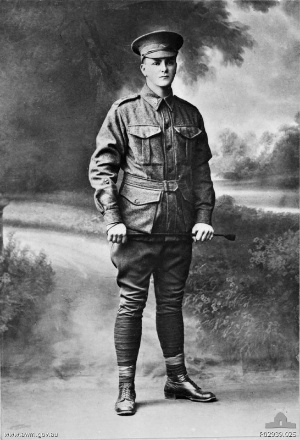
- Patrick Joseph Bugden, c. 1916
- Born: 17 March 1897; South Gundurimba, Australia
- Died: 28 September 1917 (aged 20); Polygon Wood, Zonnebeke, Belgium
- Military career
- Allegiance: Australia
- Branch: Australian Imperial Force
- Service years: 1916–17
- Rank: Private
- Units: 31st Battalion
- Conflicts: First World War; Western Front; Battle of Passchendaele; Battle of Polygon Wood †
- Awards: Victoria Cross

Patrick Joseph Bugden, VC (17 March 1897 – 28 September 1917) was an Australian recipient of the Victoria Cross, the highest award for gallantry in the face of the enemy that can be awarded to British and Commonwealth forces. He served during the First World War in the 31st Battalion, Australian Imperial Force and was killed during the Battle of Polygon Wood during which he displayed the bravery for which he was posthumously awarded the VC.

== Early life ==
Patrick Bugden was born in the Australian state of New South Wales, at South Gundurimba on 17 March 1897. His father, a farmer, died when Bugden was still a child and his mother later remarried. After completing his schooling, he worked at a hotel in Alstonville. In 1911, he commenced a year of compulsory military service.

== First World War ==
Bugden enlisted in the Australian Imperial Force at Brisbane on 25 May 1916, claiming to be 21 years old. After completing a period of basic training, he embarked for England in September 1916 and arrived in Plymouth in December. Shortly afterwards he was admitted to hospital sick, before being sent to France in January 1917 and being taken on strength by the 31st Battalion in March. In May 1917, he was again admitted to hospital with influenza, before being released and returning to his unit.

It was at Battle of Polygon Wood near Zonnebeke in Belgium, during the Passchendaele Offensive in the period from 26 September to 28 September 1917 that Bugden performed the actions that led to his posthumous award of the Victoria Cross. During an advance by his battalion at Polygon Wood, he led small parties against strongly defended pillboxes, successfully dealing with them. He later carried out a number of rescues of wounded men, often under heavy artillery and machine gun fire. He was killed during one of these rescue missions. He was later recommended for the VC; the citation, published in the London Gazette, read:

For most conspicuous bravery and devotion to duty when, on two occasions, our advance was temporarily held up by strongly defended "pill boxes". Private Bugden, in the face of devastating fire from machine guns, gallantly led small parties to attack these strong points, and, successfully silencing the machine guns with bombs, captured the garrison at the point of the bayonet. On another occasion, when a Corporal, who had become detached from his company, had been captured and was being taken to the rear by the enemy, Private Bugden, single handed, rushed to the rescue of his comrade, shot one enemy, and bayonetted the remaining two, thus releasing the Corporal. On five occasions, he rescued wounded men under intense shell and machine gun fire, showing an utter contempt and disregard for danger. Always foremost in volunteering for any dangerous mission, it was during the execution of one of these missions that this gallant soldier was killed.

— The London Gazette, 23 November 1917

=== Memorials ===
Bugden is buried at Hooge Crater Commonwealth War Graves Commission Cemetery. In 1997, a memorial to his service was dedicated at Alstonville, about 30 km from Tatham. The memorial is on Bugden Avenue, and the local ANZAC Day march starts there.

Bugden Avenue in the Canberra suburb of Gowrie is also named for him.

The Patrick Bugden VC Club is situated on the grounds of the 1st Battalion Royal Australian Regiment, in Townsville.

== The medal ==
Bugden's VC is on display in the Queensland Museum, South Bank. He was also entitled to the British War Medal and the Victory Medal.
