= Quinn's Post Commonwealth War Graves Commission Cemetery =

WWI CWGC cemetery in Gallipoli, Turkey

Coordinates: 40°14′18″N 26°17′30″E

Quinn's Post
- Commonwealth War Graves Commission
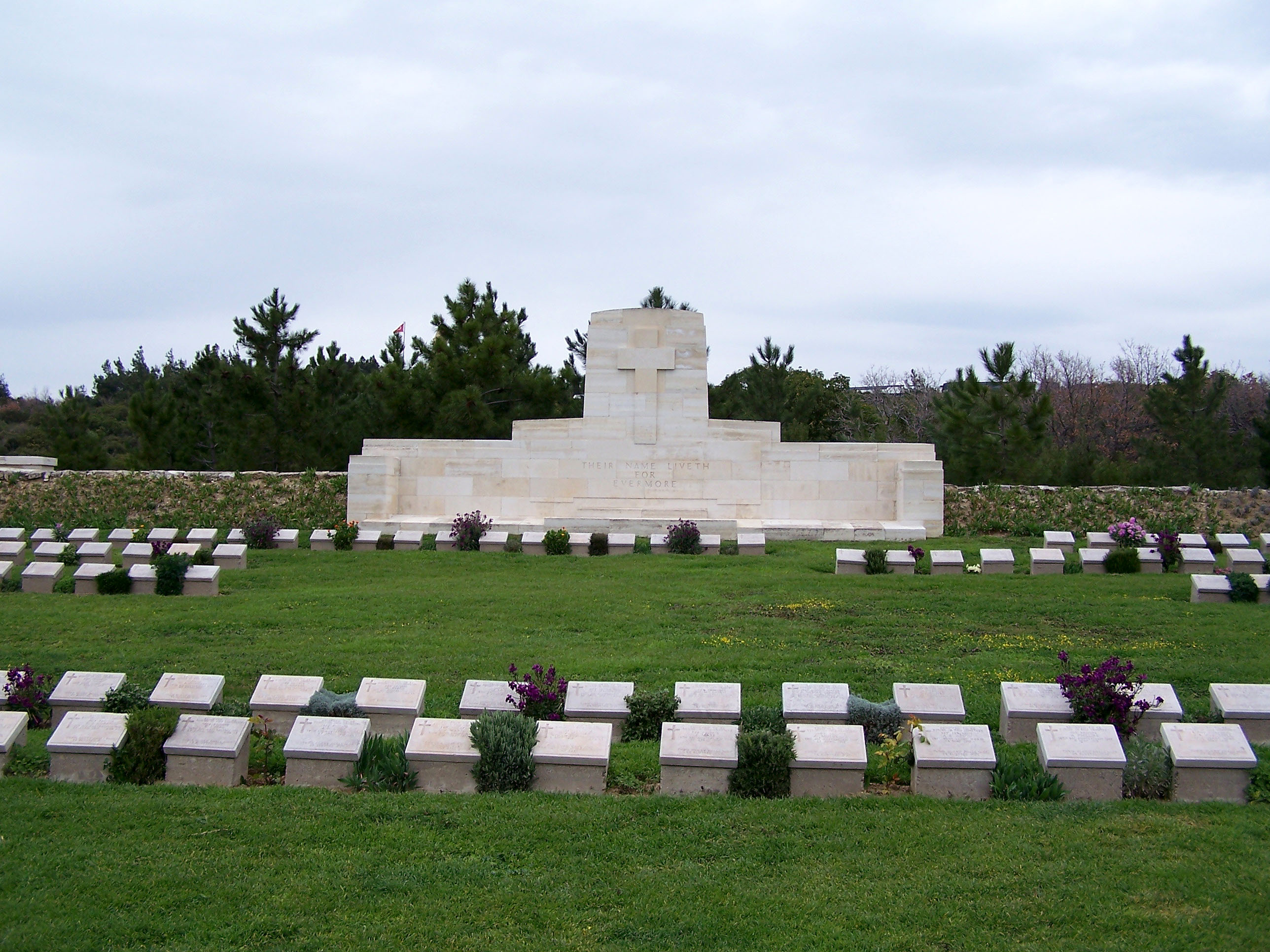
- Used for those deceased April–December 1915
- Established: Early 1920s
- Location: near Gallipoli, Turkey
- Total burials: 473

Burials by nation
- Allied Powers: Australian: 295; Unknown: 294; New Zealand: 13; United Kingdom: 1

Burials by war
- World War I: 473

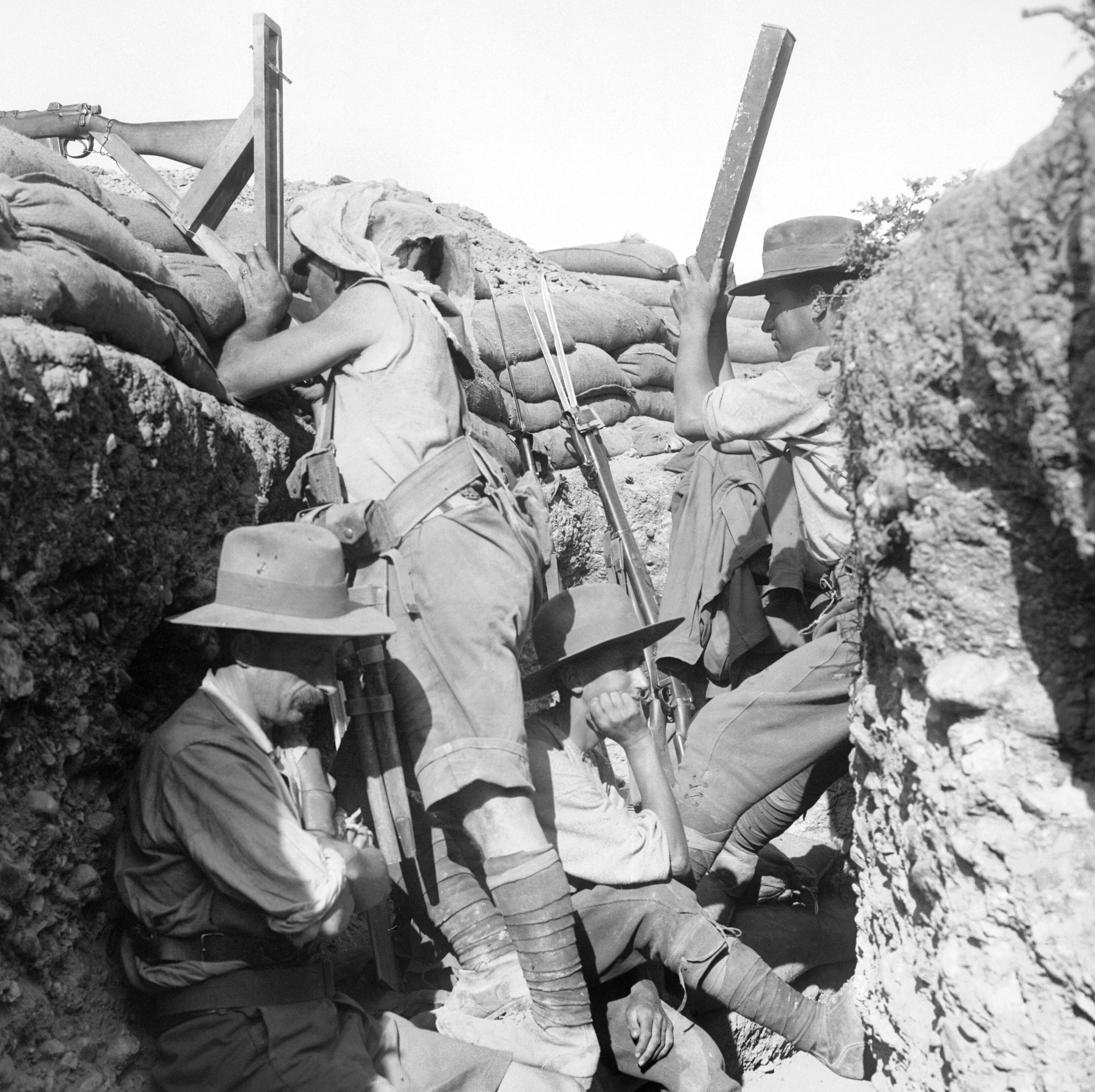
A 1915 photograph that is thought to show Quinn's post. An Australian sniper uses a periscope rifle, assisted by a spotter with a periscope

Quinn's Post Cemetery is a Commonwealth War Graves Commission cemetery from World War I in the former Anzac sector of the Gallipoli Peninsula, Turkey. The battles at Gallipoli, some of whose participating soldiers are buried at this cemetery, were an eight-month campaign fought by Commonwealth and French forces against Turkish forces in an attempt to force Turkey out of the war, to relieve the deadlock of the Western Front (France/Belgium) and to open a supply route to Russia through the Dardanelles and the Black Sea.

Quinn's post was established on the day of the landing, 25 April 1915, as a New Zealand machine gun position and was taken over by Australian troops the following day. It was held by a variety of units until the evacuation of the Anzac sector and was the site of continual attacks and hand-to-hand fighting as Turkish troops defending the peninsula strove to recapture it. Fighting was intense, with heavy casualties on both sides, as it was a key position at the end of the Anzac line. It was overlooked by Turkish positions on three sides, and subjected to incessant sniper activity, and to grenade bombardment from Turkish positions only 15 metres away. The Turkish name for the position was Bomba Sirt (bomb ridge). Periscopes were used to survey the surrounding area, although they were prone to being damaged by rifle fire, and periscope rifles eventually allowed accurate fire to be directed towards the Turkish trenches. Wire nets were erected in front of the trenches to stop grenades. In his official history, the Australian historian, Charles Bean described the holding of the post as amongst the finest achievements of the Australian force.

It was named after Major Hugh Quinn, the 27-year-old commander of C Company, 15th Battalion, Australian Imperial Force. His detachment of 226 men took over the position from troops of the 14th Battalion on 29 April. Quinn was killed there on 29 May whilst reconnoitring for an attack to recapture trenches seized by the Turks earlier in the day and is buried in Shrapnel Valley Cemetery.

The cemetery was established after the war by moving 225 isolated graves into it, along with the 73 burials in Pope's Hill Cemetery and another six graves found together nearby. 105 Australian and 10 New Zealand graves belong to identified soldiers, and memorials record the names of 64 other soldiers thought to be buried in the cemetery.
