= 178th Siege Battery, Royal Garrison Artillery =

178th Siege Battery, RGA
- Cap Badge of the Royal Regiment of Artillery
- Active: 23 June 1916–1919
- Country: United Kingdom
- Branch: British Army
- Role: Siege Artillery
- Part of: Royal Garrison Artillery
- Garrison/HQ: Edinburgh
- Engagements: Battle of Arras; Third Battle of Ypres; Battle of Cambrai; German Spring Offensive; Battle of Albert; Battle of St Quentin Canal; Second Battle of Cambrai

178th Siege Battery was a heavy howitzer unit of the Royal Garrison Artillery (RGA) formed at Edinburgh, Scotland, during World War I. It saw active service on the Western Front at Arras, Ypres and Cambrai. It distinguished itself in the fighting against the German Spring Offensive, and participated in the Allies' final Hundred Days Offensive.

== Mobilisation and training ==
On the outbreak of war in August 1914, units of the part-time Territorial Force (TF) were invited to volunteer for Overseas Service, and most of the Edinburgh-based Forth Royal Garrison Artillery did so. By October 1914, the campaign on the Western Front was bogging down into Trench warfare and there was an urgent need for batteries of siege artillery to be sent to France. The WO decided that the TF coastal gunners were well enough trained to take over many of the duties in the coastal defences, releasing Regular Army RGA gunners for service in the field. Soon the TF RGA companies that had volunteered for overseas service were also supplying trained gunners to RGA units serving overseas and providing cadres to form complete units with 'New Army' (Kitchener's Army) volunteers.

178th Siege Battery was formed on 23 June 1916 in the Forth Garrison under War Office Instruction No 1037 of 30 June 1916. To begin forming the battery a cadre of 50–60 volunteers was obtained from the Forth RGA. Another 20 or so men were transferred from 49th Company, RGA, at Bere Island, in Ireland, to which they had been drafted from the training depots in late 1915; they were sent to the RGA depot at Bexhill-on-Sea to train as signallers before joining the battery. Together with a few experienced officers and non-commissioned officers (NCOs) returned from the Western Front and completed by recruits from the depots, the personnel of the battery assembled at King's Park, Edinburgh, between 3 and 5 July. The signallers joined on 20 July. Training progressed despite the lack of equipment.

On 28 July the battery entrained at Waverley station and proceeded to Aldershot, being accommodated in Ramillies Barracks. Here the gunners were introduced to the 6-inch howitzer, and carried out field days and route marches. As a largely Scottish unit the battery was always preceded on the march by a piper. On 15 September Captain J.J. Saunders arrived from 109th Heavy Bty in France as officer commanding (OC) the battery. Then on 18 September the battery entrained for Larkhill where it carried out a firing course, and then went to Stockcross Camp near Newbury on 22 September to begin mobilisation for overseas service. It was equipped with four modern 6-inch 26 cwt howitzers, which were sent to Avonmouth Docks on 6 October. The rest of the battery embarked on SS Lydia at Southampton two days later.

== Service ==
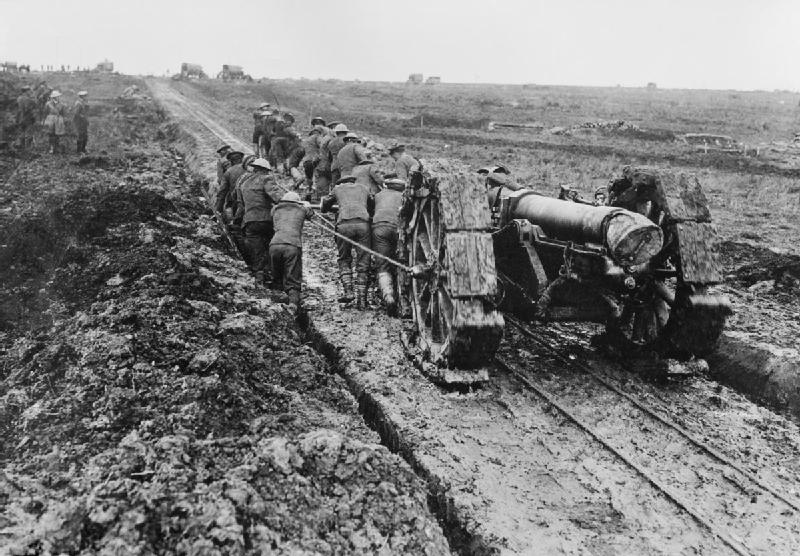
6-inch howitzer being moved through mud on the Western Front.

The battery disembarked at Le Havre and once the guns and stores had arrived it entrained on 11 October for Savy, the railhead for the Arras sector. It then went into existing guns positions near Dainville, with Right Section on the Arras–Doullens road and Left Section in a sunken road near the railway station. The men were billeted in Dainville, but moved to dugouts alongside the guns when the village came under shellfire. Two observation posts (OPs) codenamed 'Opera Box' and 'Duchess' were established in the infantry's reserve trenches, later supplemented by 'Spaxton' in Beaumetz village. From 13 October, the battery formed part of 54th Heavy Artillery Group (HAG) with Third Army. 178th Siege Bty began registering its guns on Ficheux Mill, enemy batteries and other targets for VII Corps on 19 October. 54th HAG handed its batteries over to 47th HAG on 10 November and then the battery hauled its guns about 1 mile (1.6 km) up the Arras–Doullens road to positions near Berneville, where it joined 65th HAG on 15 November. Daily firing continued on various targets.

The battery reverted to the command of 54th HAG on 19 December, then 65th HAG headquarters took over again on 24 December, when the battery was ordered to move by motor transport to positions near the Arras–St Pol road, with the off-duty gunners billeted in Anzin-Saint-Aubin. New OPs were established at 'Ann', 'Eve' and '66', and later at 'Vulcan' on top of a 120 feet (37 m) chimney near Arras station. The group was now under VI Corps' Heavy Artillery (HA). Captain Saunders was promoted to major. On 6 January 1917, 178th Siege Bty took part in its first organised bombardment, covering a daylight trench raid, when the new '106' fuze proved excellent for destroying barbed wire, followed by counter-battery (CB) fire. On 15 January the battery transferred to the tactical command of 48th HAG while the other batteries in 47th HAG prepared new positions, but the work remained the same, mainly CB fire, sometimes in cooperation with observation aircraft. On 18 February VI Corps HA was reorganised, and 178th Siege Bty came under the command of 22nd HAG. The battery began digging new gun-pits at St Nicolas, a suburb of Arras, with the gunners billeted in the town.

=== Arras ===
Third Army was now preparing for its Arras Offensive. 72nd HAG HQ moved into the area on 23 March and formed a double group with 22nd HAG, when 178th Siege Bty came under the new HQ. The gunners spent much of their time unloading lorry loads of ammunition, and then carrying it to the gun pits. Six thousand rounds were allocated to 178th Siege Bty, which was heavily engaged in neutralising CB shoots, though the Germans had gained air superiority and several British observation aircraft were shot down. They Germans also stepped up their own fire to disrupt the preparations, firing large numbers of gas shells into Arras. The main bombardment was planned to last for five days (V, W, X, Y and Z) beginning on 4 April. Given the mass of guns firing, the area bombarded was divided into small zones without overlapping fire, to help the FOOs spot the fall of shot of their own guns. However, visibility was poor on some of the days, so an additional day (Q) was inserted on 7 April and Z day for the attack (the First Battle of the Scarpe) became 9 April. During the bombardment the battery worked on a new OP ('Twickenham Ferry') in trenches south-east of Arras recently evacuated by the enemy; this came into use on the morning of Z day. The Forward Observation Officer (FOO) was wounded by a sniper, and the OP party captured a German in the trenches. VI Corps had captured Orange Hill and the Wancourt–Feuchy lines by the end of the day, an advance of 5,000 yards (4,600 m). As a result, the howitzers in St Nicholas were out of range, and at 12.35 178th Siege Bty was ordered to move up to previously-reconnoitred positions at Blangy in the old British front line, coming back into action before the end of the day.

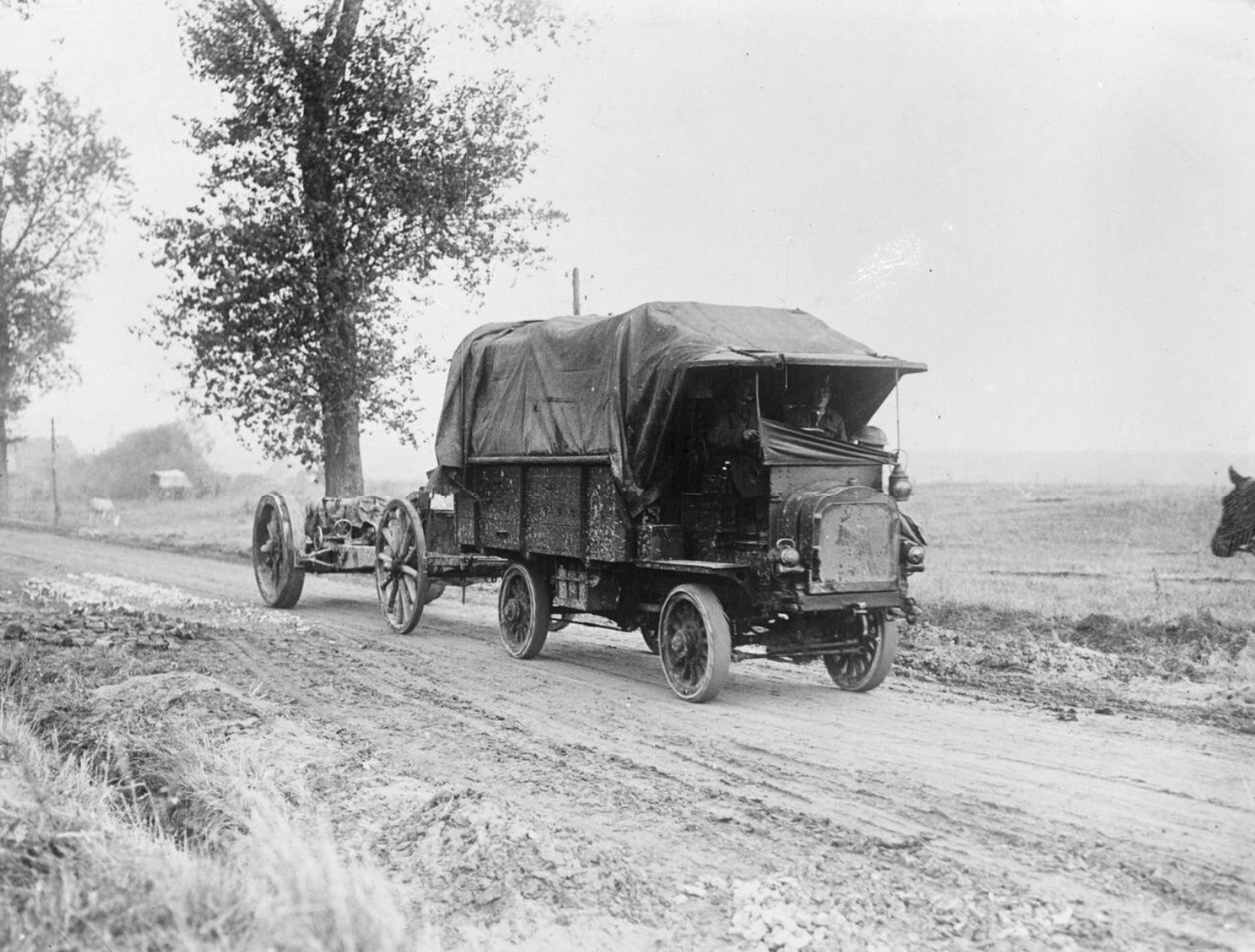
FWD Model B lorry towing a 6-inch 26 cwt howitzer.

As the offensive continued, 178th Siege Bty fired in support of the attacks on Monchy-le-Preux, then moved forward again on 13 April to Tilloy, where it took over some captured deep dugouts. The battery received its first decoration for bravery when Gunner J. Arnold removed a live grenade booby-trap from one of these dugouts and was awarded the Military Medal (MM). The new gun positions were under enemy observation, so they were moved back behind a crest, just as enemy fire came down on the first positions. Heavy fire programmes continued, the battery often firing 700 rounds per day – 1203 on one occasion. A further three-day bombardment (X, Y and Z) preceded the Second Battle of the Scarpe on 23 April. On the night of 30 April the battery moved up to the old 'Brown Line' near Wancourt, its FWD Model B gun tractors pulling the howitzers into position in open fields, where the gunners soon built dugouts. Another three-day bombardment preceded the Third Battle of the Scarpe on 3 May, but the attack largely failed. As the offensive petered out, the gunners were sent for a few days' rest, first Right Section, then Left. On 25 May a German shell destroyed a dugout, killing and mortally wounding four men. The battery was pulled out of its exposed position into new camouflaged gunpits in 'Happy Valley' near Wancourt on 3 June. A Decauville Railway brought ammunition to the guns during the night. On 14 June the battery supported the successful attack on the 'Spur' and 'Hook' trenches in front of Wancourt. At 17.00 the FOO in the railway cutting OP spotted German troops concentrating for a counter-attack, and the battery dispersed this with shellfire.

=== Ypres ===
On 24 June an advance party of 178th Siege Bty left for the Ypres Salient, followed by the two guns of Right Section on 1 July and by 4 July the whole battery was concentrated at 'Asylum Corner' in Ypres, with the gunners billeted in Vlamertinge. After overhauling its guns and preparing positions, the battery joined 77th HAG on 10 July. This group had recently joined XIX Corps, which had come into the line with Fifth Army to carry out the planned Flanders offensive (the Third Battle of Ypres). The preliminary bombardment began on 12 June, with the full artillery preparation beginning on 16 July. The Germans still had air superiority and better OPs, and the British artillery in the Salient received considerable CB fire: on 18 July a heavy concentration came down on 178th Siege Bty, causing a number of casualties. However, the British build-up continued and as time went by the guns began to get the upper hand. Ammunition expenditure was prodigious: on the fist day the four guns of the battery fired over 1200 rounds between them, and one gun crew later managed 360 in a day. The delayed attack (the Battle of Pilckem Ridge) was launched at 03.45 on 31 July. 55th (West Lancashire) Division of XIX Corps succeeded in crossing the obstacle of the Steenbeke stream and pressed on past Hill 35 towards the third and fourth objectives, but found that the heavy artillery had hardly touched the concrete pillboxes on the higher slope. The Germans counter-attacked at 17.00, and although the guns fired their SOS tasks, causing heavy casualties, the British infantry had to relinquish Hill 35 and several strongpoints they had captured. Two OP parties from 178th Siege Bty which had established themselves in 'Plum Farm' and 'Apple Villa' were also forced to leave hurriedly. At the end of the day 55th (WL) Division held a line just across the Steenbeke and the guns kept up a harassing barrage throughout the night.

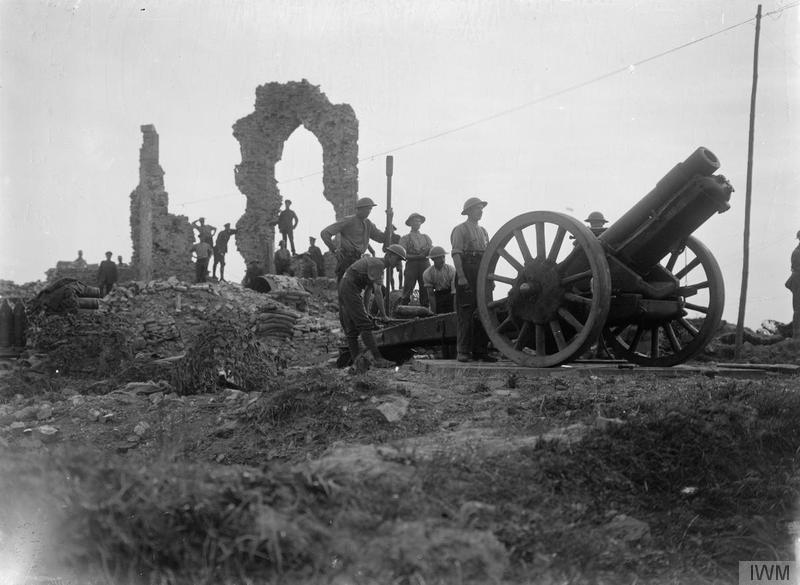
6-inch howitzer and crew during the Ypres offensive, 1917.

Heavy rain then set in and the battlefield turned to mud, severely hampering movement, while the poor visibility restricted observation, so the guns had to fire 'off the map'. The next phase of the offensive was therefore delayed. Meanwhile the German artillery continued to harass the packed British gun lines. XIX Corps' attack at the Battle of Langemarck on 16 August was halted by pillboxes and strongpoints that the heavy artillery had missed, and was then driven back by a strong German counter-attack that was not spotted by the observers in the smoke.

On 24 August 178th Siege Bty manhandled its guns out and across shell-pitted ground into new positions at 'The Vinery' near Sint-Jan. It was screened from direct observation, but was bombed several times. XIX Corps was involved in fighting near Zonnebeke on 27 August. During the bombardment the battery was endangered by 'prematures' – shells bursting overhead from the field guns firing from behind the battery. The attack failed to make any progress, but the battery kept up its fire all day, responding to a further five SOS calls during the night. By now Second Army had taken over the main direction of the offensive and there was a pause of some weeks for reorganisation. However, 178th Siege Bty found these weeks as intense as anything it had experienced so far. On 10 September the battery transferred to the command of 42nd HAG (which a few days later came under Second Army). Next day the battery received a heavy bombardment with Mustard gas and around 40 gunners were evacuated to hospital.

178th Siege Bty continued daily firing during the more successful battles of the Menin Road Ridge (20–25 September) and Polygon Wood (26 September–3 October). It fired a particularly heavy programme for the Anzac Corps at the Battle of Broodseinde on 4 October, but that night Right Section was relieved by 15th Siege Bty. Left Section's guns were hauled out next day by Holt 75 caterpillar tractors and dragged through thick mud and the old German front line to positions on Frezenberg Ridge previously held by Australian field artillery. Here they attempted to support further attacks (the Battle of Poelcappelle), but the trails of the howitzers had to be dug out of the mud after every few rounds. Finally the rest of 15th Siege Bty arrived on 14 October and the section marched south to rejoin Right Section. Right Section had taken over 15th Siege Bty's guns at Wancourt in the Arras sector under 81st HAG (Third Army) and had already fired in support of a raid by the Argyll and Sutherland Highlanders on 'Beetle Trench' on 14 October. However, the sector was generally quiet.

=== Cambrai ===
178th Siege Bty was assigned to 90th HAG on 24 October and moved further south to Saint-Léger. Apart from calibration shoots, there was no firing, and the battery undertook some training. After this rest, the battery moved out on 14 November and next day took up positions in a sunken road near Havrincourt Wood. Here it joined 17th HAG under IV Corps for Third Army's Battle of Cambrai. After a struggle to get the guns into position in the mud during the hours of darkness, an OP was established on the east side of the wood, after which the battery remained 'silent' until the attack was launched at 06.20 on 20 November.

The massive barrage, fired without any previous registration or bombardment, caught the Germans by surprise, and the infantry advance was headed by large numbers of tanks. A party of 277th Siege Bty, who shared 178th's OP, followed the attack, keeping in communication with 178th for a while, but the line then went dead; one of 178th's signallers went forward, finding the OP party pinned down and taking casualties from snipers. Later two of 178th's signallers followed the advance right through the Hindenburg Line defences, which had been completely overrun. Although the tanks going through Havrincourt Wood had been held up by the trees, 62nd (2nd West Riding) Division took the outpost line and when the tanks came up they quickly gained their second objective.

The attack had been least successful on the left, where the Germans still held Mœuvres and Bourlon, so 17th HAG was sent across to support a follow-up attack by IV Corps. 178th Siege Bty emplaced its guns at Demicourt, about 1,500 yards (1,400 m) from the line, while the men were billeted in Hermies. The fresh bombardment opened at 10.10 on 23 November, then lifted forwards 20 minutes later as 40th Division attacked Bourlon Wood. Most of the wood was captured after fierce fighting, but further advance was impossible, and the fighting in and around the wood continued for several days. By 28 November the Germans had brought up more artillery and 178th Siege Bty came under heavy shellfire. A serious German counter-attack was made on 30 November, its bombardment cutting all of the battery's communications, though it fired on its pre-arranged SOS lines. By 11.00 the accuracy of the shelling had driven 178th's crews into shelter, suffering a number of casualties. It was also heavily shelled with mustard gas, and attacked by a German aircraft. By the end of the day the battery was pulled out to Hermies. Although the garrison of Bourlon Wood, 47th (1/2nd London) Division, was forced off the crest of the ridge, it held on to most of the wood and there was no breakthrough on IV Corps' front. V Corps HQ took over the sector, and on 2 December the heavy artillery broke up further Germans attacks and 47th Division was able to recover the crest of the ridge. However, Third Army had to withdraw to more defensible positions (the Flesquières Line), and the fighting died down on 7 December.

=== Winter 1917–18 ===
17th HAG HQ moved away on 8 December and 178th Siege Bty joined 89th HAG next day. By now HAG allocations were becoming more fixed, and during December 1917 they were converted into permanent RGA brigades. For the rest of the war the battery was part of 89th (8-inch Howitzer) Bde, RGA, along with one 8-inch howitzer battery and two other 6-inch howitzer batteries. The brigade was at rest at Beauval, near Doullens, and 178th Siege Bty moved out by road on 7 January 1918 to join it. It was difficult journey in icy conditions, across the Canal du Nord then two days along roads that required the gunners to man drag-ropes to assist the FWD gun tractors. After resting at Beauval, the battery entrained at Doullens and returned to the line at Gouzeaucourt in the Cambrai sector on 29 January. A month later it returned to its former positions at Hermies. To avoid enemy air observation, the gunners stayed away from the camouflaged guns unless they were in action. The area was quiet apart from occasional shelling, but on 12 March the area was subjected to a heavy mustard gas bombardment, and 178th Siege Bty had to lend 22 gunners to keep 68th Siege Bty in action. In anticipation of a German attack, wire and reserve trenches were prepared around the gun lines.

=== Spring Offensive ===
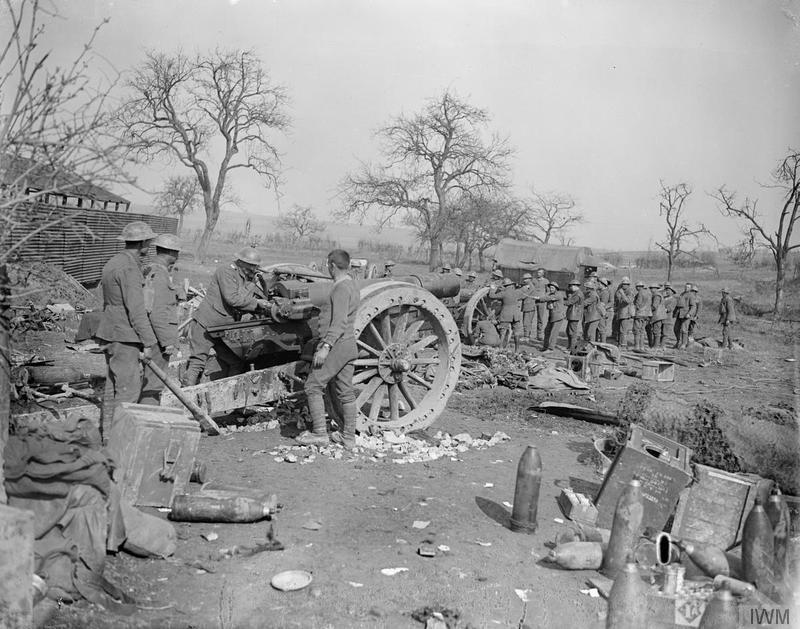
RGA gunners with 6-inch howitzers in March 1918.

The expected German Spring Offensive opened on the morning of 21 March 1918. The most vulnerable part of Third Army's front was the Flesquières Salient remaining after the Battle of Cambrai and the flanks of the salient were heavily attacked while the Germans put down a heavy bombardment on V Corps' front. 178th Siege Bty began to reply, firing pre-arranged tasks in response to SOS signals from the infantry, while OPs were blinded by morning mist and their communications were cut. At 05.45 a direct hit on No 3 gun pit damaged the gun, No 2 was knocked out next, and casualties began to mount. The battery kept the remaining two guns in action all morning until the gunners were ordered to take cover from the shellfire. During the afternoon a volunteer crew got No 4 gun back into action, with an officer as gun-layer, and a rotation of gunners kept firing, the party with 68th Siege Bty making the dangerous journey through Havrincourt Wood to come back and help. At 18.00 the battery was ordered to pull out by sections, but the lorries could not get to the battery along the shell-torn roads. 17th (Northern) Division was still fighting in front of Hermies and 63rd (Royal Naval) Division had thrown out a German incursion into their lines during the day, but the situation on the flanks was becoming critical. At 02.30 next morning the gunners withdrew to Neuville, taking with them their breechblocks and sights. At 09.30 17th (N) Division still held its positions, so Capt G.H. Cooke led the gunners back to haul the guns out of their pits and then prepared to pull them across a bridge to ready for the FWDs. The gunners were machine-gunned by two enemy aircraft and were driven into cover, then the position was heavily shelled for two hours. Finally, at 22.00 the FWDs withdrew the battery under moonlight to Neuville. On 23 March V Corps began a withdrawal from the front line to its Battle Zone reduce its increasingly dangerous salient.

Despite V Corps' success in holding on, the BEF was facing disaster on a wide front, and the so-called 'Great Retreat' had begun. Preparations for battery positions at Neuville were abandoned and 178th Siege Bty was ordered to continue to Rocquigny. Only a few rounds were fired from here because of lack of information on British positions, and there was some German shelling. After dark the guns joined the stream of British troops retreating across the devastated area of the old Somme battlefield. They were sent towards Combles, but this was reported occupied by the enemy, so they were diverted to Albert. After a few hours' sleep the gunners limbered up again, and the battery came into action with its repaired guns at Contalmaison during the night of 24/25 March. Next morning the battery engaged a target just 4,000 yards (3,700 m) away and then moved out again to avoid capture. It was sent forward again to Fricourt on 25 March, carried out a shoot here, then two more from Millencourt next day against Germans advancing on Albert, retiring between each shoot. By now Australian reinforcements had arrived and V Corps' front was stabilising west of Albert and the River Ancre. 178th Siege Bty ended its retreat in Warloy-Baillon on 29 March.

The battery spent the next four months in this area. Having moved behind Hénencourt Wood from its original exposed position, the battery supported operations by Australian Corps and regularly shelled Albert and the enemy communications at night. The Germans renewed their attacks on this front on 5 April (the Battle of the Ancre) and on 24 April (the Second Battle of Villers-Bretonneux) but were decisively stopped, the British artillery playing an important role in their defeat. The gun lines were shelled with mustard gas and bombed from the air, but to little effect. As a precaution, 178th Siege Bty moved its Left Section about a mile away to Senlis-le-Sec, to remain silent except in response to SOS calls. The battery improved its dugouts and camouflage and kept up harassing fire at night, or supported small operations by Australian and V Corps. On 30 May Right Section was driven out of its position by mustard gas, and moved to a dry stream bed near Left Section. The OC, Maj Saunders, transferred to a Kite balloon section of the Royal Air Force and Capt Cooke was promoted to succeed him. On 2 July the battery exchanged with 225th Siege Bty, taking over its guns near Millencourt, but a few days later so many of its gunners were affected by the Spanish flu epidemic that Right Section had to hand over its guns to 68th Siege Bty for a while. Most of the firing from this position was against enemy batteries.

=== Hundred Days Offensive ===
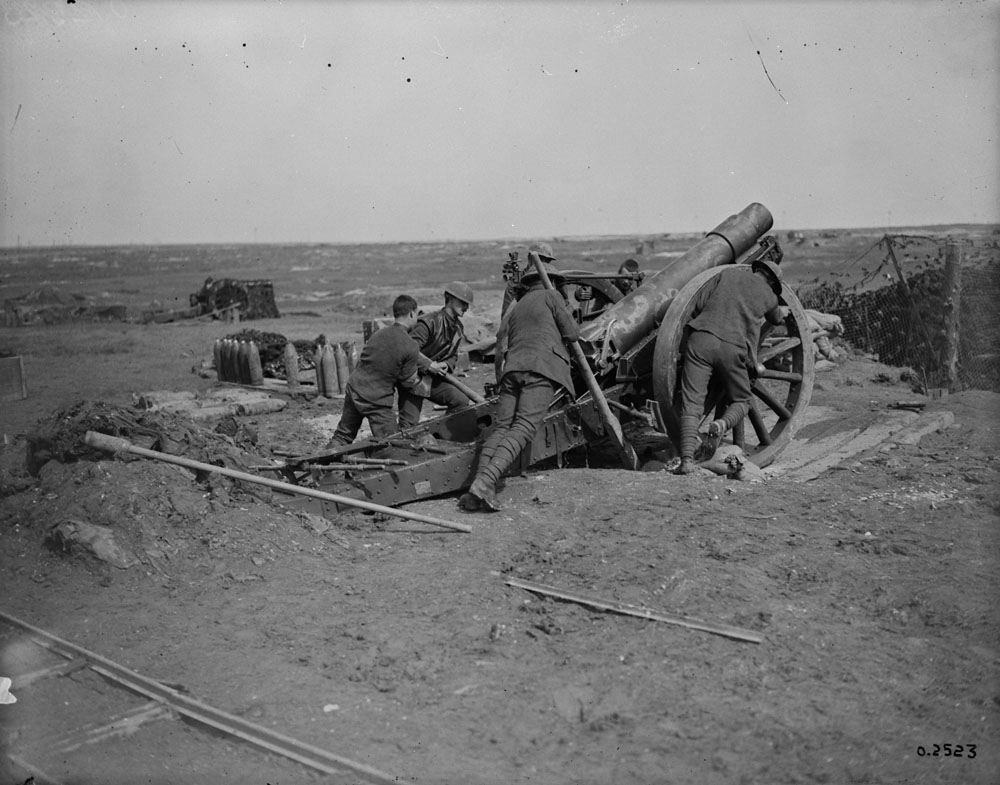
Crew positioning a 6-inch 26 cwt howitzer in 1918.

The Allied Hundred Days Offensive was launched by Fourth Army on 8 August at the Battle of Amiens. Although still positioned behind Albert in the area of V Corps (Third Army), 89th Bde was now officially part of Fourth Army to its right, and was heavily engaged firing across the Ancre in support of III Corps, who had taken the sector over from the Australians. 178th Siege Bty continued its normal night firing by neutralising four hostile batteries between 03.00 and 03.30; then at Zero (04.20) all the guns in the brigade opened fire. 178th's task until 07.30 was CB fire, using gas and high explosive (HE) shells in irregular bursts. Then, when the infantry had taken their first objectives, it was switched to counter-preparation fire against likely counter-attacks by firing at enemy batteries in the Bécordel-Bécourt Valley. By 22.50 the battery had engaged 26 targets during the day. It continued CB fire the next day as III Corps completed its tasks.

III Corps resumed its attack on 22 August at the Battle of Albert, with 89th Bde supporting 18th (Eastern) Division across the Ancre to recapture Albert. The German line now began to crack, and early next morning 178th and 68th Siege Btys moved their guns forward to the Bouzincourt Valley. They took part in a heavy barrage opening at 01.00 on 24 August and on 25 August the pursuit began, with 178th Siege Bty leaving its billets in Warloy and driving through Albert to follow the retreating Germans as 18th (E) Division took Trônes Wood and Montauban. The mobility of the battery's FWDs and lorries was an advantage, and over the following days it came into action at Mametz, Guillemont – where it received heavy retaliatory shelling – Combles and Manancourt, where on the evening of 5 September it was within 400 yards (370 m) of the retreating Germans. After a short spell of firing the battery went up to Sorel-le-Grand, where the vehicles drove through a mustard gas bombardment without casualties. The advance now paused as the Germans were back in their Hindenburg Line defences. The battery came out of action on 9 September for a few days' rest. However, German guns were ranged onto the position by observation aircraft, and the battery moved out again as it came under shellfire, and took up new positions near Saulcourt. On the night of 17/18 September the billets at Équancourt were bombarded, and in two days over 30 mustard gas casualties were evacuated.

The Allies now carried out a series of attacks all along the Western Front, culminating with Fourth Army's assault on the St Quentin Canal on 29 September. III Corps' role was for 12th (Eastern) and 18th (Eastern) Divisions to 'mop up' the area as far as the canal at Vendhuile and provide a link to the main assault. The night before, 178th Siege Bty moved up to a valley in front of Ronssoy, only 1,000 yards (910 m) from the enemy and occasionally swept by bursts of machine gun fire. During the attack it fired heavy concentrations on all strongpoints in the enemy positions. The Battle of the St Quentin Canal was a triumph, and by 4 October the battery had crossed the Hindenburg Line at Bony and was advancing through crowds of liberated French civilians. It took up positions beyond Railway Ridge, with excellent OPs for the next phase of the attack on the Beaurevoir Line. (3–5 October). The battery moved forward again on 7 October to Gouy, with billets in the Hindenburg Line dugouts. Next day it supported the attack on Serain (part of the Second Battle of Cambrai). III Corps HQ had been transferred to Fifth Army, and 89th Bde now came under XIII Corps. The corps had brought up massive amounts of ammunition for this attack, which went in at 05.10 with two divisions (25th and 66th (2nd East Lancashire)) and quickly took its objectives. There was no exploitation because of the difficulty of getting the artillery forward: 89th Brigade's guns were all out of range.

178th Siege Bty had fired its last shots. 89th Brigade was pulled out for rest, and was then sent north to join Fifth Army where its gunners were employed in railway repair behind the advance. It did not go back in action before hostilities ended on 11 November with the Armistice with Germany.

== Postwar ==
178th Siege Bty went into winter quarters at Phalempin on 27 November, and by 14 December the first of its men left for demobilisation.

In the interim order of battle for the postwar army the battery was supposed to form 155th Bty in XXXIX Brigade, RGA, but this was rescinded after the signing of the Treaty of Versailles, and the remaining cadre of the battery was disbanded in 1919.

During the war the battery had suffered 22 killed or died of wounds, and 112 wounded or gassed.
