= 68th Siege Battery, Royal Garrison Artillery =

68th Siege Battery, RGA
- Cap Badge of the Royal Regiment of Artillery
- Active: 9 October 1915–1919
- Country: United Kingdom
- Branch: British Army
- Role: Siege Artillery
- Part of: Royal Garrison Artillery
- Garrison/HQ: Pembroke Dock
- Equipment: BL 6-inch 30 cwt howitzer BL 6-inch 26 cwt howitzer
- Engagements: Battle of the Somme; Battle of Passchendaele; German Spring Offensive; Battle of Amiens; Battle of Albert; Battle of the St Quentin Canal

Insignia
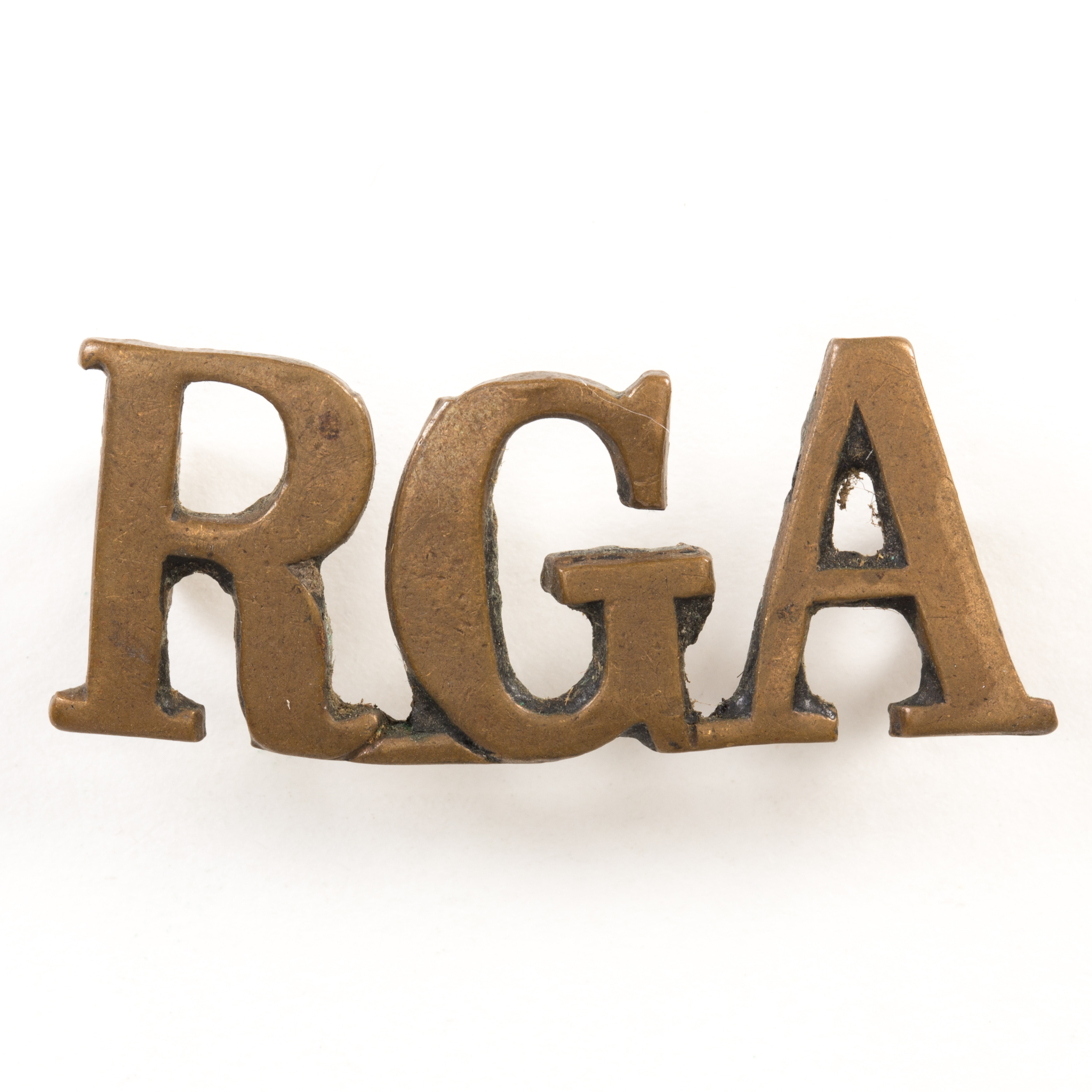
- Shoulder title

68th Siege Battery was a unit of Britain's Royal Garrison Artillery (RGA) formed in Wales during World War I. It served on the Western Front, including the Battles of the Somme and Passchendaele, defended against the German Spring Offensive and took part in the crushing victories of the Allied Hundred Days Offensive in 1918.

== Mobilisation ==
68th Siege Battery was formed under War Office Instruction 144 of October 1915 from one company of the Pembroke Royal Garrison Artillery of the Territorial Force (TF) based at Pembroke Dock in West Wales, together with an equal number of recruits from the Regular RGA. (Note: Nos 44 and 57 Companies, RGA, formed part of the Regular Army garrison at Pembroke Dock.) In addition, No 652 Company, Army Service Corps (ASC), was formed on 19 February 1916, as Battery Ammunition Column Motor Transport for 68th and 69th Siege Btys.

== Service ==
The battery left the UK on 31 March 1916 and landed at Le Havre on 1 April to join the British Expeditionary Force (BEF). On 13 April it took over four obsolescent 6-inch 30 cwt howitzers from 28th Siege Bty and joined VI Corps' Heavy Artillery the following day. Its ASC company was absorbed into the heavy artillery ammunition column on 25 April.

VI Corps was part of Third Army, holding the BEF's front from Arras to Hébuterne. The gunners of 68th Siege Bty learned their trade in the Arras sector and then moved to Sailly-au-Bois to join VII Corps, which was preparing for the Attack on the Gommecourt Salient in the forthcoming 'Big Push' (the Battle of the Somme).

=== Gommecourt ===
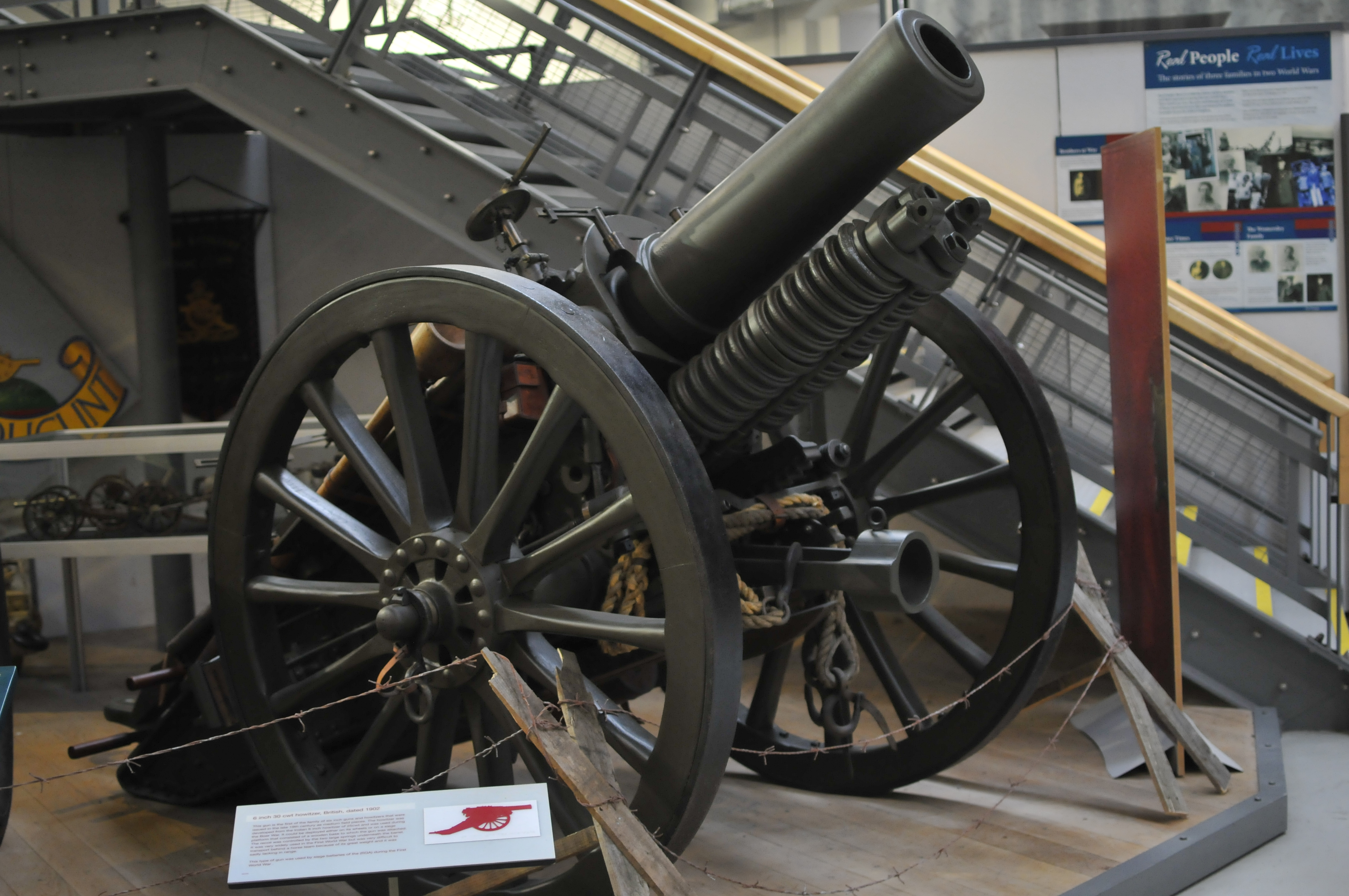
6-inch 30 cwt Howitzer preserved by the Royal Artillery Museum.

Right Half Battery arrived at Sailly on 2 June and began digging positions in an apple orchard for the guns that arrived during the night of 7/8 June. The two guns started firing registration shots on 16 June. Left Half Battery began digging in on 15 June and opened fire on 25 June. The battery formed part of 35th Heavy Artillery Group (HAG), but before the battle was attached to 47th HAG, which formed a sub-group under 35th HAG's command. The group's main role was to use the high-angle fire of its howitzers to bombard German trenches and strongpoints facing 56th (1/1st London) Division's attack frontage on the south side of the Gommecourt salient. The specific targets assigned to 68th Siege Bty along with the 9.2-inch heavy howitzers of 91st and 94th Siege Btys were the strongpoints at Gommecourt Cemetery and the eastern edge of The Maze, the trenches codenamed Mess, Mere, Meed and Meet running along the top of the ridge into Rossignol Wood, and the communication trenches codenamed Exe, Ems, and Epte. However, a shortage of shells for the new 6-inch 26 cwt howitzers meant that 68th Siege Bty with its old 30 cwt howitzers also had to take on much of the programme allotted to 88th and 98th (Canadian) Siege Btys of 47th HAG preparing for 46th (North Midland) Division's attack on the north side of the salient, where the 68th had no observation post (OP) of its own.

The bombardment programme was spread over five days, U, V, W, X and Y before the assault was launched on Z day. 68th Siege Bty opened fire on V day (25 June), but the trench bombardment and barbed wire-cutting (Note: Heavy howitzers were rarely used for wire-cutting because their shells threw up impassable clumps of barbed wire separated by deep craters.) was unsatisfactory because ground mist prevented observation and the BE2c observation aircraft of No 8 Squadron Royal Flying Corps that was supposed to be spotting fall of shot was out of contact for much of the day. Most of the battery's firing was blind 'searching and sweeping' fire on 88th Siege Bty's behalf. No 2 Gun suffered a premature burst, which wounded five of the detachment, though two of them remained on duty. W Day was much the same, Maj Mayne complaining that he had no aerial observation (though there were two BE2cs in the air all day), and the battery's OP was itself under heavy shellfire. Two salvoes of German Shrapnel shells burst near the battery without causing casualties. Ammunition supply was also a problem because the track of the Decauville light railway delivering shells to Sailly collapsed in the wet weather. On X day the battery fired its full programme, blind in the morning because of the poor communications with the aircraft, but with good observed shooting in the afternoon. Because of poor weather on Y day, the attack was postponed for two days, and the additional days (Y1 and Y2) were used for further bombardment. On Y1 the battery had easy observation and reported good shooting, though ammunition was short and the aircraft's wireless broke down. Overall, the damage caused to the German positions was insufficient to suppress the defenders.

On Z Day (1 July), the entire artillery supporting 56th Division fired a 65-minute bombardment of the German front, starting at 06.25. At 07.30 the guns lifted onto their pre-arranged targets in the German support and reserve lines as the infantry got out of their forward trenches and advanced towards Gommecourt. From 07.50 68th Siege Bty maintained a slow rate of fire on Anna communication trench from Point 147 to Rossignol Wood. At first all went well for 56th Division. Despite casualties from the German counter-bombardment on their jumping-off trenches, the smoke and morning mist helped the infantry, and they reached the German front line with little loss and moved on towards the second and reserve lines. The artillery OPs reported the signboards erected by the leading waves to mark their progress. However, the OPs themselves came under attack from the German guns, which laid a Barrage across No man's land preventing supplies and reinforcements from reaching the leading infantry waves who had entered the German trenches. At 08.44, 35th HAG ordered Left Section of 68th Siege Bty to change target to Gommecourt Wood to support 46th Division's failing attack, and for the rest of the day the guns were switched between the wood and Anna, Etch and Epte trenches. By midday, the Germans were launching concerted counter-attacks from all directions, including Epte, Ems and Etch trenches, and by mid-afternoon 56th Division's slight gains were being eroded. All the remaining gains had to be abandoned after dark.

VII Corps' costly attack was only a diversion from the main BEF attack further south, and was not renewed after the first day. 68th Siege Bty was transferred to 21st HAG with Fourth Army, which continued the offensive throughout the summer and autumn. On 13 September the battery was rearmed with four modern Vickers-built 6-inch 26 cwt howitzers. It was switched back to Third Army with 50th HAG on 29 October, and then to First Army with 70th HAG on 29 November.

=== Ypres ===
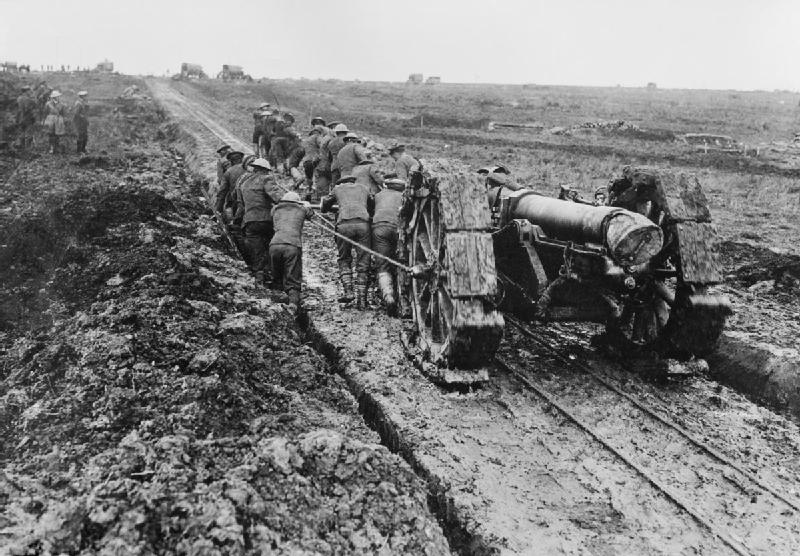
6-inch 26 cwt howitzer being moved through mud on the Western Front.

It was the policy to switch batteries between HAGs frequently as the situation demanded. On 26 January 1917, 68th Siege Bty moved to 76th HAG, then to 24th HAG with Second Army on 16 February 1917, and back to 50th HAG again on 23 February 1917. These were all in relatively quiet sectors. On 6 August 1917 the battery was joined by a section from the newly arrived 402nd Siege Bty, and was made up to a strength of six howitzers. The battery moved to 98th HAG with Second Army on 30 October 1917, in time for the final 10 days of action in the Third Ypres Offensive. Second Army had taken over direction of the faltering offensive and fought a series of successful battles employing massive weight of artillery. But as the offensive continued with the Battle of Poelcappelle and First and Second Battles of Passchendaele, the tables were turned: British batteries were clearly observable from the Passchendaele Ridge and were subjected to counter-battery (CB) fire, while their own guns sank into the mud and became difficult to move and fire. To be able to supply them with ammunition the heavy guns had to stay strung out one behind the other along the few available roads, making them an easy target.

Second Army HQ was sent to the Italian Front shortly afterwards, and the battery moved to 89th HAG on 10 December 1917. The group was at rest at Beauval, near Doullens. By now HAG allocations were becoming more fixed, and on 1 February 1918 they were converted into permanent RGA brigades. For the rest of the war the battery was part of 89th (8-inch Howitzer) Bde, RGA, along with one 8-inch howitzer battery and two other 6-inch howitzer batteries. On 29 December 68th Siege Bty entrained at Doullens as the brigade moved to join V Corps with Third Army.

=== Spring Offensive ===
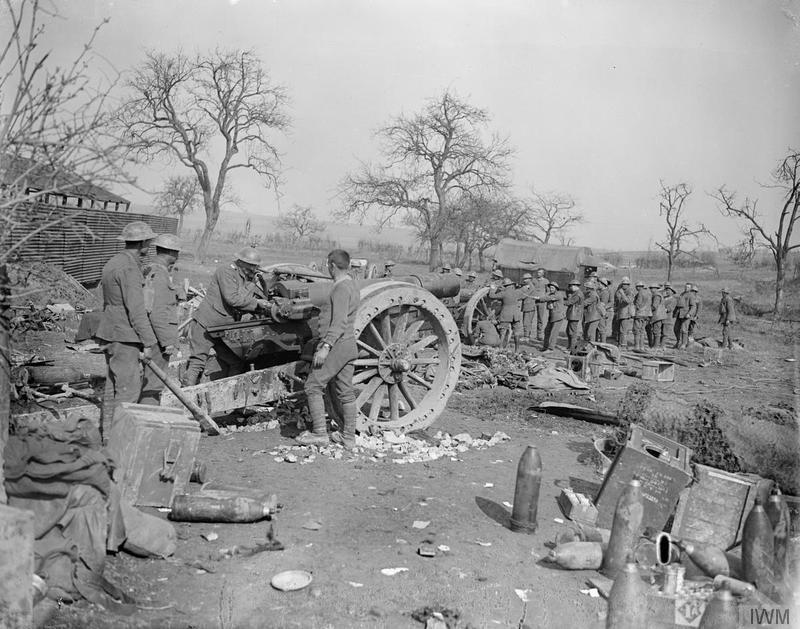
RGA gunners with 6-inch howitzers in March 1918.

V Corps was occupying the Flesquières salient, along the line where fighting had ended after the Battle of Cambrai and subsequent German counter-attacks. 68th Siege Bty was positioned at Ytres. The area was quiet apart from occasional shelling, but on 12 March it was subjected to a heavy Mustard gas bombardment. 68th Siege Bty's gunners were badly affected, and 178th Siege Bty had to lend 22 gunners to keep the battery in action.

The expected German Spring Offensive opened on the morning of 21 March 1918. The most vulnerable part of Third Army's front was the Flesquières salient and its flanks were heavily attacked while the Germans put down a heavy bombardment on V Corps' front. 89th Brigade's batteries began to reply, firing pre-arranged tasks in response to SOS signals from the infantry, while their OPs were blinded by morning mist and their communications were cut. The party from 178th Siege Bty made the dangerous journey through Havrincourt Wood in the middle of the bombardment to go back and help their own battery. When the mist cleared the British guns caused heavy casualties to the attackers. At the end of the day, 17th (Northern) Division was still fighting in front of Hermies and 63rd (Royal Naval) Division had thrown out a German incursion into their lines during the day, but the situation on the flanks was becoming critical.

Next morning, V Corps Heavy Artillery ordered 89th Bde's batteries to retire to new positions, apart from 68th Siege Bty, which remained in place. When the Germans renewed the attack they were halted with heavy casualties. Despite V Corps' success in holding on, the BEF was facing disaster on a wide front, and the so-called 'Great Retreat' had begun. That night V Corps was ordered to begin withdrawing from the exposed Flesquières salient and on 23 March the guns joined the stream of British troops retreating across the devastated area of the old Somme battlefield towards Albert.

On 25 March 68th Siege Bty took up positions behind Albert, ready for action, and next day it was firing on targets given by 17th Divisional Artillery. By now Australian reinforcements had arrived and V Corps' front was stabilising west of Albert and the River Ancre. 89th Brigade regrouped and began regularly shelling Albert and harassing the enemy communications at night with high explosive and gas shells. The Germans renewed their attacks on this front on 5 April (the Battle of the Ancre) and on 24 April (the Second Battle of Villers-Bretonneux) but were decisively stopped, the British artillery playing an important role in their defeat. 68th Siege Bty's commander, Acting Major Alexander Robertson, was mortally wounded on 21 April, dying in hospital two days later. Temporary Captain J.O. Lucas was appointed to take over command.

89th Brigade spent the next four months in the area, supporting Australian Corps, then III Corps took over in May. It continued its night harassing fire and supported Australian and British raids. The gun lines were sometimes shelled with mustard gas and bombed from the air, but to little effect; 68th Siege Bty moved its forward and central sections to new positions on 20 May. In July it had to take over temporarily a section of guns from 178th Siege Bty near Millencourt, which was badly affected by the Spanish flu epidemic. The batteries were able to carry out some training during the early summer. Increasingly, the guns were engaged in CB fire.

=== Hundred Days Offensive ===
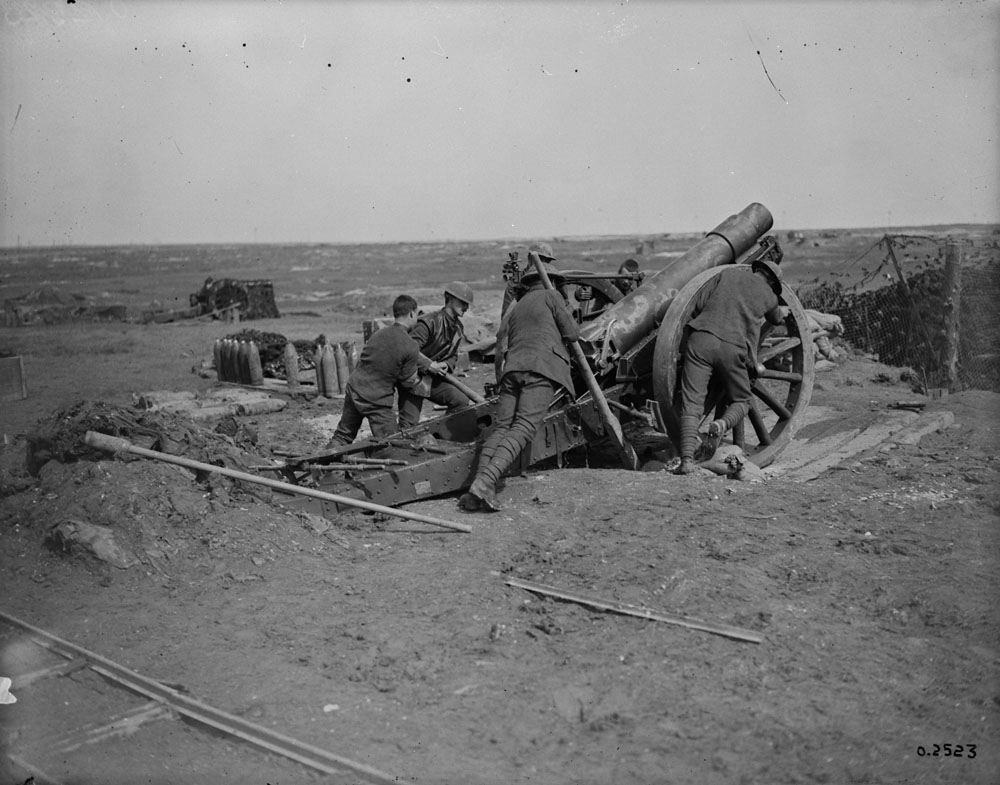
Crew positioning a 6-inch 26 cwt howitzer.

The Allied Hundred Days Offensive was launched by Fourth Army on 8 August at the Battle of Amiens. Although still positioned behind Albert in the area of V Corps (Third Army), 89th Bde was part of Fourth Army to its right, and was heavily engaged firing across the Ancre in support of III Corps. At Zero (04.20) all the guns in the brigade opened fire. 68th Siege Bty's task was to participate in the protective barrage for the attacking troops, while the two guns in the forward position swept and searched the villages of Bécordel-Bécourt, ceasing fire at 09.15 as the infantry reached the village. III Corps failed to take all its objectives, but completed them next day.

III Corps resumed its attack on 22 August at the Battle of Albert, with 89th Bde supporting 18th (Eastern) Division across the Ancre to recapture Albert; 68th Siege Bty carried out CB fire. The German line now began to crack, and early next morning 178th and 68th Siege Btys moved their guns forward to the Bouzincourt Valley. They took part in a heavy barrage opening at 01.00 on 24 August and on 25 August the pursuit began, with 68th Siege Bty driving through Albert despite holdups from heavy rain. On 27 August it fired on Trônes Wood, which had been holding up 18th (E) Division. The brigade then moved up through Montauban to Combles. By 9 September it had reached Nurlu, with the batteries firing on the German trenches just east of Épehy. The advance now paused as the Germans were nearly back in their Hindenburg Line defences; 89th Brigade noted a significant increase in hostile artillery fire.

The Allies now carried out a series of attacks all along the Western Front, culminating in Fourth Army's assault on the St Quentin Canal on 29 September. III Corps' role was for 12th (Eastern) and 18th (Eastern) Divisions to 'mop up' the area as far as the canal at Vendhuile and provide a link to the main assault. During the attack 89th Bde fired heavy concentrations on strongpoints in the enemy positions, then swept and searched enemy trenches further back. The Battle of the St Quentin Canal was a triumph. However, between 29 September and 1 October 68th Siege Bty suffered 42 casualties, mainly due to mustard gas.

III Corps HQ was now transferred to Fifth Army, and from 3 October 89th Bde came under XIII Corps for the next phase of the attack on the Beaurevoir Line (3–5 October). The brigade moved forward again on 7 October and next day it supported the attack on Serain (part of the Second Battle of Cambrai). Two sections of 68th Siege Bty were assigned to CB work. The corps had brought up massive amounts of ammunition for this attack, which went in at 05.10 with two divisions (25th and 66th (2nd East Lancashire)) and quickly took its objectives. There was no exploitation because of the difficulty of getting the artillery forward: 89th Brigade's guns were all out of range by the end of the day.

68th Siege Bty had fired its last shots. 89th Brigade was pulled out for rest, and was then sent north to join Fifth Army where its gunners were employed in railway repair behind the advance. It did not go back in action before hostilities ended on 11 November with the Armistice with Germany. (Note: The Official History indicates that 89th Bde continued with Fourth Army for the Battle of the Selle, but this is contradicted by the brigade's own war diary and 178th Siege Bty's history.)

== Postwar ==
89th Brigade went into winter quarters at Phalempin on 27 November, and soon the first of its men left for demobilisation. 68th Siege Bty was disbanded in 1919. (A new 68th Bty, RGA, was formed on 16 April 1919 from the wartime 21st Heavy Bty.)
