= Royal South Australia Regiment =

Australian Army Reserve unit

- Cap badge of the Royal South Australia Regiment
- Active: 1960 – present
- Country: Australia
- Branch: Army
- Type: Infantry
- Role: Light role
- Size: One battalion
- Part of: 9th Brigade
- Garrison/HQ: 10th/27th Battalion – Keswick
- Motto: Pro Patria (For Country)
- March: Song of Australia/Scotland the Brave

Commanders
- Commanding Officer: LTCOL Samuel Benveniste
- Representative Colonel: Frances Adamson (Governor of South Australia)

Insignia
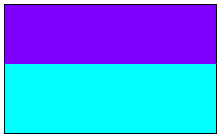
- Unit colour patch
- Tartan: Seaforth Mackenzie
- Abbreviation: RSAR

Colours of the 10th Battalion and 27th Battalion RSAR and hat colour patch

The Royal South Australia Regiment is a reserve regiment of the Australian Army consisting of a single battalion, the 10th/27th Battalion, part of the 9th Brigade. It was raised on 1 July 1960, as The South Australia Regiment.

== History ==
The Regiment traces much of its history to early volunteer and citizen militia units from pre-federation Australia. The history of the units that formed the current Regiment are dealt with individually on those pages.

=== 1960 – present ===
On 1 July 1960 the South Australia Regiment was formed by the amalgamation of three infantry battalions in South Australia:

- The 10th Infantry Battalion (The Adelaide Rifles)
- 43rd/48th Infantry Battalion (The Hindmarsh Regiment)
- 27th Infantry Battalion (The South Australia Scottish Regiment).

These three battalions were formed into 5 Companies:

- A Company (The South East Company) (from the SA Scottish Regt)
- B Company (The River Company) (from the SA Scottish Regt)
- C Company (The Mid North Company) (from the Hindmarsh Regt)
- D Company (The Adelaide Company) (from the Adelaide Rifles)
- E Company (The Port Adelaide Company) (from the Adelaide Rifles)

Later in 1960, The Regiment was renamed 1st Battalion Royal South Australia Regiment, bringing it in line with the other State and National regiments. On 1 July 1965, the Regiment was reformed as 2 battalions, taking their names from the battalions that formed the regiment: The 10th and 27th. On 29 November 1987, the 10th and 27th battalions were amalgamated to form the 10/27 Battalion Royal South Australia Regiment, the Regiment's current title.

== Other information ==
The Royal South Australia Regiment has been awarded the Freedoms of the following towns:

- Kadina 1994
- Unley 2006
- Adelaide 2015

== Preceding units ==
The organisation of military units in Australia has been a complex and shifting affair since colonisation. The following is an attempt to list the preceding units of the RSAR in chronological order. Units were raised, disbanded and perpetuated in a variety of forms that is not easy to show in a simple list. Often units, depending on their status as volunteer, militia, or regular, were similarly numbered and named, for example the 43rd Infantry Battalion and 2/43 Battalion, AIF in World War II, and often units were split, amalgamated, resplit and reformed, making it almost impossible to create a straight family tree as is often seen for the British Army.

A broad statement is that the Royal South Australia Regiment is preceded by units often known as the 10th (or 78th or Adelaide Rifles), 27th (or SA Scottish or Boothby), 43rd (or 76th or SA Infantry or Hindmarsh), and 48th (or Torrens), and units bearing these designations are now perpetuated in RSAR.

- 1st and 2nd Battalions Adelaide Rifles: 1854–1856
- Adelaide Regiment of Volunteer Rifles: 1860–1866, 1866–1867
- Prince Alfred's Rifle Volunteers: 1867–1867
- Regiment of Adelaide Rifles: 1877–1888?
- 1st Regiment South Australian Infantry: 1888? – 1903
- 10th Australian Infantry Regiment (Adelaide Rifles): 1903–1912
- South Australian Infantry Regiment: 1903–
- South Australian Scottish Infantry: 1903–
- 76th Battalion Senior Cadets: ?–1918
- 78th Battalion Senior Cadets: ?–1918
- 1st Battalion, 10th Australian Infantry Regiment: 1903–1912
- 78th Infantry (Adelaide Rifles): 1912
- 76th Infantry: 1912–1913
- 76th (Hindmarsh) Infantry: 1913–1918
- 43rd Battalion, AIF: 1914–1918
- 43rd Infantry Battalion (The Hindmarsh Regiment): 1918–1921
- 10th Infantry Regiment (The Adelaide Rifles): 1918–1921
- 10th Battalion: 1921–1927
- 43rd Battalion: 1921–1927
- 10th Battalion (The Adelaide Rifles): 1927–1930, 1936–1942
- 43rd Battalion (The Hindmarsh Regiment): 1927–1930
- 10th/50th Battalion: 1930–1936
- 43rd/48th Battalion: 1930–1942?
- 2/43rd Battalion, AIF: 1939–1946
- 10th/48th Battalion: 1942–1943
- 43rd Australian Infantry Battalion: 1942?–1944
- 10th/48th Australian Infantry Battalion: 1943–1945
- 10th Infantry Battalion (The Adelaide Rifles): 1948–1960
- 43rd/48th Infantry Battalion (The Hindmarsh Regiment): 1952–1960
- 43rd (Remote Area) Battalion, The Royal South Australia Regiment: 1966–1987?
- 27th Infantry Battalion (The South Australia Scottish Regiment)
- 74th Infantry
- 1st Battalion South Australia Infantry
- 74th (Boothby) Infantry
- 27th Infantry (Boothby Regiment)
- 27th Battalion AIF
- 2/27th Battalion AIF
- 27th Battalion (Boothby Regiment)
- 27th Battalion (South Australian Regiment)
- 27th Battalion (South Australian Scottish Regiment)
- 48th Infantry Battalion (The Torrens Regiment)
- 10th/48th Infantry Battalion

== Contemporary Times ==
Current structure:

- Battalion Headquarters
- 2 Rifle Companies:

A Company and B Company

- Support Company
- 3rd Field Squadron, Royal Australian Engineers

As part of the Plan Beersheba Reforms, the 81 mm mortar-equipped 6th/13th Light Battery (formed through an amalgamation of the 16th and 48th Field Batteries) and 3rd Field Squadron were absorbed in the Battalion in 2013 and 2014 respectively in order to provide the Battalion with organic offensive support coordination and indirect firepower, and light engineering support. 6th/13th Light Battery was later amalgamated with other Light Batteries in the 2nd Division to form the 9th Regiment, RAA.

Unit Deployments:

Operation Anode Rotation 14, Operation Anode Rotation 17, Operation Anode Rotation 24, Operation Anode Rotation 27, Operation Resolute, Operation Vic Fires Assist, Operation Cyclone Yassi Assist, Operation Testament.

Individual and Group Deployments:

Operation Slipper, Operation Catalyst, Operation Mazurka, Operation Astute, Operation Spire.

== Alliances ==
- United Kingdom – The Highlanders
- United Kingdom – The Duke of Lancaster's Regiment (King's, Lancashire and Border)
- New Zealand – The Otago and Southland Regiment

== Battle honours ==
- South Africa 1899–1902
- World War I
  - Middle East: Egypt 1915–1916, Anzac, Gallipoli 1915
  - Western Front: Pozières, Messines 1917, Menin Road, Amiens, Somme 1916, Somme 1918, France and Flanders 1916–1918, Polygon Wood, Broodseinde, Poelcapelle, Bullecourt, Ypres 1917, Passchendaele, Mont St Quentin, Beaurevoir, Hindenburg Line, Albert 1918
- World War II
  - North Africa and Middle East: North Africa 1941, Syria 1941, The Litani, Sidon, Adlun, Damour, Defence of Tobruk, The Salient 1941, El Alamein,
  - Pacific: South-West Pacific 1942–1945, Buna–Gona, Cape Endaidere–Simemi Creek, Sanananda–Cape Killerton, Milne Bay, Liberation of Australian New Guinea, Shaggy Ridge, Efogi–Menari, Finschhafen, Kokoda Trail, Ramu Valley, Sattelberg, Borneo, Balikpapan
