= 27th Battalion (Australia) =

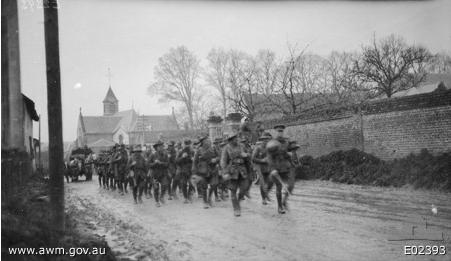
- Members of the 27th Battalion marching through Beaucourt-sur-l'Ancre in the Somme, France, 7 April 1918
- Active: 1915–1919; 1921–1946; 1948–1960; 1965–1987
- Country: Australia
- Branch: Australian Army
- Type: Infantry
- Size: ~800–1,000 men (Note: During World War I, the authorised strength of an Australian infantry battalion was 1,023 men. By the start of World War II, it was 910 men all ranks, however, later in the war it fell to 803.)
- Part of: 7th Brigade (1915–19); 3rd Brigade (1921–42); 23rd Brigade (1942–46); 9th Brigade (1948–60; 1965–87)
- Nickname: South Australian Scottish Regiment
- Motto: Primus inter Pares
- Colours: Brown over blue
- March: The Campbells Are Coming
- Engagements: World War I: Gallipoli campaign; Western Front; World War II: Bougainville campaign

Insignia
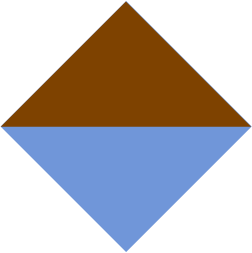
- Unit colour patch

The 27th Battalion was an infantry battalion of the Australian Army. It was initially raised in 1915 as part of the all-volunteer First Australian Imperial Force for service during World War I. During the conflict, the battalion saw action briefly at Gallipoli before later fighting on the Western Front between 1916 and 1918. It was disbanded in 1919, but was re-raised in 1921 as part of the Citizens Force, which later became the "Militia". During World War II the battalion was used mainly in a garrison role until the last year of the war when it was committed to the fighting against the Japanese during the Bougainville campaign. Following the end of hostilities it was disbanded in May 1946. Between 1948 and 1965 the battalion was re-raised and disbanded a number of times before eventually becoming part of the Royal South Australia Regiment. It was disbanded for a final time in 1987, when it was amalgamated with the 10th Battalion, Royal South Australia Regiment to form the 10th/27th Battalion, Royal South Australia Regiment.

== History ==
=== World War I ===
Because of the restrictions that the Defence Act (1903) placed upon deploying units of the Citizens Force overseas, following the outbreak of World War I, the Australian government decided to raise an all volunteer force for overseas service. This force was known as the Australian Imperial Force (AIF). Initially, the AIF was to consist of only one infantry division, but following the despatch of the 1st Division in late 1914 further units were raised and these were eventually organised to form the 2nd Division. As part of the 2nd Division, the 27th Battalion was formed on 16 March 1915 at Ascot Park Camp, Adelaide, from recruits drawn mainly from South Australia, who had originally been allocated to the 24th Battalion. After a period of basic training, the battalion embarked for the Middle East on the troopship HMAT A2 Geelong on 31 May 1915, arriving there on 6 July.

==== Gallipoli ====
They then undertook a further two months of training in Egypt before an urgent request for reinforcements led to them being dispatched to join the Gallipoli campaign; they landed at Anzac Cove on 12 September. Attached to the 7th Brigade, along with the 25th, 26th and 28th Battalions, they reinforced the battle-worn New Zealand and Australian Division and took up a defensive position on Cheshire Ridge. Throughout October they defended the ridge, during which time they suffered five killed and 29 wounded, before being relieved by New Zealanders in early November. After this they moved to new positions in Mule Gulley where they undertook further defensive operations alongside the 26th Battalion. Losses during this time amounted to two killed and eight wounded. In December, they took over from the 28th Battalion around Happy Valley, before the decision was made to evacuate the Allied forces from the peninsula. On 12 December 1915, the battalion embarked upon the Osmaliegh, bound for Lemnos Island.

Following this the 27th Battalion returned to Egypt, where the AIF undertook a period of training and re-organisation as reinforcements arrived from Australia. During this time the AIF was expanded from two infantry divisions to four – with a fifth forming in Australia – and many infantry battalions that had seen service at Gallipoli were split up to provide cadre staff for the newly raised battalions. The battalions of the 2nd Division, however, were not split up in this manner and the 27th Battalion remained intact.

==== Western Front ====
In early 1916, the decision was made to transfer part of the AIF to Europe to take part in the fighting in the trenches along the Western Front in France and Belgium. Still attached to the 7th Brigade, the 27th Battalion entered the front-line for the first time on 7 April 1916 as the Australians took over a quiet sector near Armentières. On 8 July 1916, the 7th Brigade was ordered to march to the Somme to support the Australian 1st Division which was taking part in the fighting around Pozières. On 28 July, the 7th Brigade undertook an attack on the German line, however, during this time the 27th Battalion was held back in reserve. The attack proved unsuccessful and as a result it was ordered to launch a second attack on 4 August, centred upon German positions around Bapaume.

This time the 27th Battalion was to play a key role. Moving off from positions around La Boiselle in the afternoon, the battalion advanced with two companies forward and two back in reserve under the cover of an intense artillery barrage. Due to congestion around the assembly trenches, the battalion arrived at its objective late. Nevertheless, the first wave managed to capture the first line of German trenches and although the follow-up waves became lost amidst thick smoke, the two assault companies began to consolidate their position during the night. In the early morning of 5 August, a heavy German counterattack was launched. This was turned back at considerable cost, with the Germans suffering an estimated 100 men killed and 60 men captured. Following this, the battalion sent out patrols into no man's land as reinforcements were brought up. Later during the day their positions were subjected to heavy shellfire from German guns positioned around Thiepval. Although successful, the attack proved costly with the battalion reporting the following casualties: 40 killed, 289 wounded and 67 missing. Afterwards they were relieved by the 48th Battalion and were eventually transferred to Belgium where they were rested in a 'quiet' sector south of Zillebeke.

In early October, the battalion undertook a number of small scale raids on the German line, capturing a number of prisoners, before they were withdrawn from the line on 27 October and transferred back to the Somme where they subsequently took part in two unsuccessful attacks against German positions east of Flers. In January 1917, the 7th Brigade moved into the Le Sars sector where they took over from British units that were holding the line near Mametz. Offensive operations during this time were largely curtailed by bad weather, but on 2 March the battalions of the 5th and 7th Brigades launched a combined attack north of Warlencourt. The initial assault yielded some ground, but the Germans completed a successful outflanking move on the left, which threatened to take the momentum out of the attack. As reinforcements were brought up, the 27th Battalion linked up with the 26th Battalion on its left flank near the Loupart Road and, under the cover of mist, managed to establish a new trench line 500 yards (460 m) long and captured a number of prisoners.

The battalion's next engagement came on 26 March 1917 when they undertook an attack on Lagnicourt, during which they lost 11 killed and 29 wounded. The 27th Battalion did not undertake a major engagement until 20 September when they took part in the Battle of Menin Road, which resulted in success for the Australians. During the battle, they were committed to the fighting as part of the first wave which routed the German forces. Advancing under a cover of artillery and machine gun fire, the battalion captured a section of the German line known as the 'Blue Line' between Polygon Wood and a position known as the Iron Cross Redoubt. Later, they successfully took part in the Battle of Broodseinde on 4 October, which was their last major offensive action in 1917.

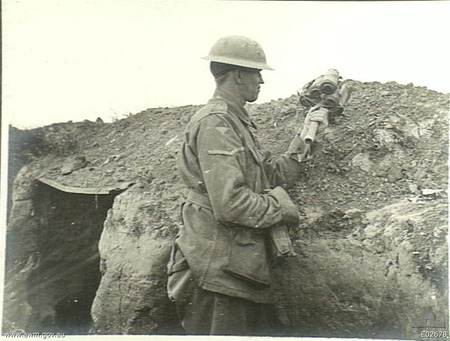
A soldier from the 27th Battalion in the trenches at Villers-Bretonneux, July 1918

In early 1918, the 7th Brigade was placed in divisional reserve around Romarin as extreme winter weather conditions set in. At the end of January the brigade was relieved and moved back to Henneveux where it was tasked with covering a 24-mile (39 km) length of the line. During this time the 27th Battalion was near full strength, with 43 officers and 993 men, and was positioned between Bellebrune and Crémarest. They remained there throughout February and March during which time they undertook training and the men were given leave to visit Boulogne. In March 1918, the Germans launched their Spring Offensive in an effort to bring about an end to the war. The offensive saw considerable tactical gains, and although the Australian Corps missed the opening phase of the offensive as they were out of line at the time, they were brought up in April to help stem the tide of the German advance. As a part of this effort, the 27th Battalion returned to the battlefields of the Somme, as the 7th Brigade relieved the 13th Brigade around the Somme Canal on the night of 7/8 April. At the end of the month they moved to the Camon–Rivery area. As the German offensive became focused upon Villers–Bretonneux they were called upon to undertake a supporting role to the Australian counterattack, relieving the 6th Brigade around Ville-sur-Ancre following the 6th's assault on the town.

In early June, plans were made for the Australian 2nd Division to attack around Morlancourt in preparation for a more significant attack at Hamel. On 10 June, the battalion advanced on the right of the 7th Brigade's line, capturing the German front line trenches around Morlancourt and wiping out a whole battalion, taking 325 prisoners for the loss of 400 men. On 4 July the battalion undertook a supporting role in the successful Australian attack at Hamel, following up the initial success with a further, albeit small, advance on 8 July. After the German offensive petered out, the 27th Battalion undertook peaceful penetration operations against the German line as the Allies began to prepare to launch their own offensive.

On 8 August 1918, the Allies launched their Hundred Days Offensive. During the fighting around Amiens, the battalion was responsible for capturing 200 prisoners as well as a number of machine guns and artillery pieces. They remained in the line throughout August and September, undertaking further attacks at Biaches and Mont St Quentin. Casualties during this time were high and by the end of September 1918 the battalion's strength had fallen to 31 officers and 537 men. Their final engagement of the war came on the night of 3 October 1918, when they took part in the Battle of Beaurevoir. During this battle, the battalion attacked around Prospect Hill, suffering 67 casualties. The following night they crossed the Estrees Road and took up position northeast of Estrees to support the 6th Brigade which was attacking positions beyond Beaurevoir.

Following this, the battalions of the Australian Corps were removed from the line for rest on 5 October, after a request from the Australian prime minister, Billy Hughes. They had been severely depleted and were suffering from acute manpower shortages as a result of the combination of a decrease in the number of volunteers from Australia and the decision to grant home leave to men who had served for over four years. Subsequently, when the armistice was signed on 11 November 1918, the Australian Corps had not returned to the front and was still in the rear reorganising and training. With the end of hostilities the demobilisation process began, and men were slowly repatriated back to Australia. The process took a considerable period of time, though, and a large number of men were able to undertake tertiary and vocational training in England and France to prepare for their return to civilian life. Finally, as numbers dwindled, the battalion was disbanded on 4 June 1919.

The battalion suffered 762 men killed or died on active service during the war, as well as a further 2,155 wounded. (Note: The wounded figure includes 86 men who were gassed.) Members of the 27th Battalion received a number of decorations, including: one Companion of the Order of St Michael and St George (CMG), five Distinguished Service Orders (DSOs), 20 Military Crosses (MCs) and two bars, 14 Distinguished Conduct Medals (DCMs), 69 Military Medals (MMs) and two bars, five Meritorious Service Medals (MSMs), 21 Mentions in Despatches (MIDs) and six foreign awards. (Note: The Australian War Memorial source does not indicate what these foreign awards were specifically.) A total of 16 battle honours were awarded to the 27th Battalion for its involvement in the fighting on Gallipoli and the Western Front.

=== Interwar years ===
In 1921, the decision was made to perpetuate the battle honours and traditions of the AIF by re-organising the units of the Citizens Force to adopt the numerical designations of their related AIF units. (Note: Upon formation, the units of the 1st AIF were raised from men drawn from the recruitment territory of already established Citizens Force units and as a consequence many 1st AIF units retained links to Citizens Force units from where they drew the majority of the initial intake of personnel.) The 27th Battalion had been recruited mainly from personnel that had served in the 74th (Boothby) Infantry Regiment, and as a result, on 1 May 1921, the 74th's successor units—the 2nd and 5th Battalions, 27th Regiment—were amalgamated to re-raise the 27th Battalion. Through this link, the 27th inherited the battle honour "South Africa 1899–1902". Upon establishment, the battalion formed part of the 3rd Brigade and was based in South Australia where it formed part of the 4th Military District. (Note: In 1918, the infantry regiments of the Citizens Force were reorganised so that their numerical designations mirrored those of the AIF. Within these regiments a number of battalions were raised—sometimes as many as five—with the 1st Battalion being the inactive reserve battalion formed from ex-AIF personnel, the 2nd Battalion being the Citizens Force battalion, the 3rd Battalion formed from Senior Cadets and so forth. Consequently, the 74th (Boothby) Infantry Regiment was redesignated the 27th Regiment and raised five battalions.)

In 1927, territorial titles were adopted by the units of the Citizens Force, and as a result the battalion adopted the title of the "South Australian Regiment". It also adopted the motto of "Primus inter Pares", meaning "First Among Equals". The following year, 1928, the battalion formed an alliance with the Royal Inniskilling Fusiliers, which were also known as the 27th Regiment of Foot. A year later, following the election of the Scullin Labor government, the compulsory training scheme was abolished and in its place a new system was introduced whereby the Citizens Forces would be maintained on a part-time, voluntary basis only. It was also renamed the "Militia" at this time. The decision to suspend compulsory training, coupled with the economic downturn of the Great Depression meant that the manpower of many Militia units dropped considerably and as a result the decision was made to amalgamate a number of units. The 27th Battalion, however, did not suffer this fate and in 1938 it adopted the territorial title of "South Australian Scottish Regiment" and was afforded the right to wear the MacKenzie tartan, after forming an alliance with the Seaforth Highlanders. At the same time it also raised a pipe band.

=== World War II ===
Following the outbreak of World War II, due to the provisions of the Defence Act (1903) which precluded deploying the Militia outside of Australian territory, the government decided to raise an all volunteer force for overseas service, known as the Second Australian Imperial Force (2nd AIF). As such while the Militia would provide a cadre for this force, its main role was to provide training to conscripts as part of the compulsory training scheme which was re-established in early 1940. During this time the Militia were called up in cohorts for periods of continuous training and the 27th Battalion, along with the rest of the 3rd Brigade, undertook garrison duties in South Australia as well as running number of training camps designed to increase the nation's preparedness in case of war in the Pacific. With Japan's entry into the war following the attacks on Pearl Harbor and Malaya, the battalion was mobilised for wartime service on 9 December 1941 and transported to Darwin in northern Australia where it formed part of the garrison force to defend against possible Japanese attack. During this time it was based at Winnellie and took part in building defences in the north.

Later, in December 1942, the 27th Battalion was transferred from the 3rd Brigade to the 23rd Brigade. This formation had previously been a part of the 2nd AIF, but the loss of several of its battalions when they had been deployed to Ambon, Timor and Rabaul, had resulted in it being re-formed with Militia battalions and the 27th joined the 7th and 8th Battalions to round out its establishment. In March 1943, after having endured several bombings by Japanese aircraft since their arrival in Darwin the previous year, the battalion was replaced in the Darwin garrison and its personnel returned Adelaide for leave. In December, they regrouped on the Atherton Tablelands in Queensland for jungle training, as the 23rd Brigade—then part of the 3rd Division—was converted to the jungle establishment, in preparation for them undertaking active service in New Guinea. Around this time the battalion was gazetted as an AIF battalion, meaning that because more than 65 per cent of its personnel had volunteered for service outside of Australian territory, it could be deployed beyond the limits set out in the Defence Act (1903).

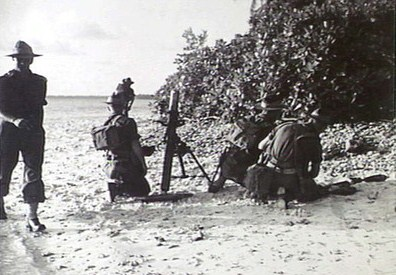
A 27th Battalion mortar team during a training exercise in December 1944

In late May 1944, the 27th Battalion was shipped to Lae, before proceeding to Wau where it underwent further jungle warfare training while waiting for the American troops to established footholds on its way to Bougainville. The battalion was deployed to Green Island, in September 1944, relieving the American troops defending Lagoon Airfield. The Americans were subsequently redeployed to the fighting in the Philippines.

In early 1945, the battalion moved to Bougainville to take part in the Australian campaign there. Initially, it was tasked with relieving the 55th/53rd Battalion at Laruma River in the central sector of the island in March. In April, the battalion pressed on to Pearl Ridge where they took over from the 31st/51st Battalion and began to carry out patrols in front of the ridge. Over the course of six weeks, the battalion carried out a number of minor attacks and in the process captured several key features before moving to the northern sector of the island on the Bonis Peninsula around Ratsua where they continued to harass Japanese forces through active patrolling and ambushing. This continued until the end of the war in August 1945.

Following the Japanese surrender, the 27th Battalion ceased operations and was transported to Torokina, where they had to wait for shipping to become available for repatriation back to Australia to begin the demobilisation process. This process began in October 1945, albeit slowly, and gradually the battalion's numbers decreased as men were repatriated back to Australia or were transferred to other units for further service. Long service men received priority for discharge, while some men volunteered to be transferred to the battalions of the 34th Brigade that were being formed on Morotai Island for service as part of the British Commonwealth Occupation Force in Japan. Finally, on 1 May 1946, the battalion was disbanded.

The 27th Battalion lost 22 men killed in action or died and 54 wounded during its service in World War II, the majority of these coming in the final weeks of the war. (Note: This includes died of wounds, accident or illness.) In addition to the normal campaign ribbons, the battalion's personnel also received a number of decorations for distinguished service and bravery, these included: one DSO, one MC, one MM and 16 MIDs. The battalion received one battle honour for its involvement in the war.

=== Post World War II ===
In 1948, with demobilisation of Australia's wartime army complete, the decision was made to re-raise the part-time forces of the Militia, albeit with the new name of the Citizens Military Force (CMF), on a reduced establishment. The 27th Battalion was re-raised in May 1948, and was once again assigned to the 3rd Division, attached to the 9th Brigade. In 1951, the compulsory training scheme was reintroduced and as a result the size of many CMF units swelled. The song, The Campbells Are Coming, was approved as the battalion's regimental march in 1953. In 1959, the national service scheme was suspended, and as a result numbers dropped once more. Following the introduction of the Pentropic divisional structure in early 1960, the CMF was reorganised and a number of infantry battalions were disbanded or amalgamated together to form six new State-based regiments.

As part of these changes, in July 1960 the 27th Battalion was amalgamated with the 43rd/48th Battalion (Hindmarsh Regiment) and 10th Battalion (The Adelaide Rifles) to form the pentropic 1st Battalion, Royal South Australia Regiment (1 RSAR), with the 27th Battalion's personnel forming 'A' and 'B' Companies within this organisation. The 16 battle honours awarded to the 2nd AIF's 2/27th Battalion, which had served in North Africa, Syria, and New Guinea with the 7th Division were entrusted to the battalion in 1961, through the promulgation of Army Order 135. In 1965, the Australian Army's experiment with the pentropic structure was abandoned and the CMF was once again reorganised with many of the pentropic battalions being split once again to form additional battalions. On 1 July 1965, 1 RSAR was split and the 10th, 27th and 43rd Battalions were reformed in their own right as battalions of the Royal South Australia Regiment. On 29 November 1987, the 10th and 27th Battalions were linked to form the 10th/27th Battalion, Royal South Australia Regiment (10/27 RSAR). This unit continues to exist to this day, maintaining the battle honours and traditions of its predecessor units.

== Alliances ==
The 27th Battalion held the following alliances:

- United Kingdom – Royal Inniskilling Fusiliers;
- United Kingdom – Seaforth Highlanders.

== Battle honours ==
The 27th Battalion was awarded the following battle honours:

- South Africa 1899–1902 (inherited);
- World War I: Somme 1916–18, Pozières, Bapaume 1917, Ypres 1917, Menin Road, Polygon Wood, Broodseinde, Poelcappelle, Passchendaele, Amiens, Albert 1918, Mont St Quentin, Hindenburg Line, Beaurevoir, France and Flanders 1916–18, Gallipoli 1915–16;
- World War II: Liberation of Australian New Guinea. (Note: These battle honours are currently maintained by the 10th/27th Battalion, Royal South Australia Regiment.)

In 1961, the battalion – although no longer on the Australian Army's order of battle – was entrusted with the battle honours awarded to the 2/27th Battalion for its service with the 2nd AIF during World War II. The honours it inherited at this time were: North Africa; Syria 1941; The Litani; Sidon; Adlun; Damour; South-West Pacific 1942–1945; Kokoda Trail; Efogi–Menari; Buna–Gona; Gona; Liberation of Australian New Guinea; Ramu Valley; Shaggy Ridge; Borneo 1945; Balikpapan.

== Commanding officers ==
World War I

- Lieutenant Colonel Walter Dollman (16 March 1915);
- Lieutenant Colonel James Charles Frederick Slane (22 August 1916);
- Lieutenant Colonel Frederick Royden Chalmers (1 October 1917).

World War II

- Lieutenant Colonel Francis Mayfield Best (1 May 1934);
- Lieutenant Colonel Lindsay Keith Farquhar (6 November 1939);
- Lieutenant Colonel Alexander Pope (14 April 1942).

== Notes ==
Footnotes

Citations
