= Lawrence Weathers =

New Zealand and Australian recipient of the Victoria Cross

Lawrence Weathers VC
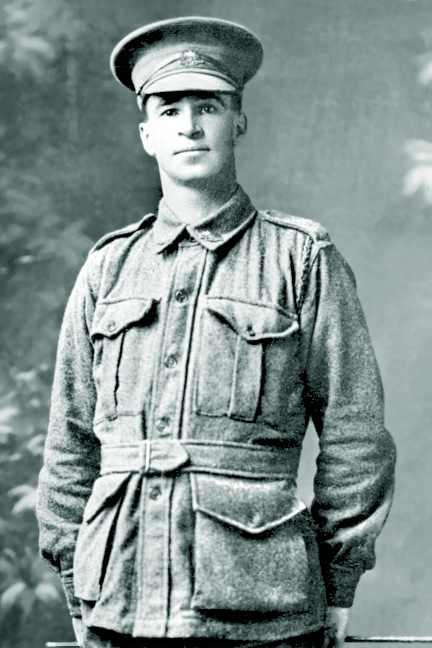
- Private Lawrence Weathers c. 1916
- Born: 14 May 1890; Te Kōpuru, New Zealand
- Died: 29 September 1918 (aged 28); Saint Quentin Canal, Péronne, France
- Military career
- Allegiance: Australia
- Branch: Australian Imperial Force
- Service years: 1916–1918
- Rank: Corporal
- Units: 43rd Battalion
- Conflicts: World War I; Western Front; Battle of Messines (WIA); German spring offensive (WIA); Battle of Hamel; Hundred Days Offensive; Battle of Amiens; Second Battle of the Somme; Battle of Mont St. Quentin; Battle of St. Quentin Canal (DOW)
- Awards: Victoria Cross

Lawrence Carthage Weathers, VC (14 May 1890 – 29 September 1918) was a New Zealand-born Australian recipient of the Victoria Cross, the highest award for gallantry in battle that could be awarded to a member of the Australian armed forces at the time. His parents returned to their native South Australia when Weathers was seven, and he completed his schooling before obtaining work as an undertaker in Adelaide. He enlisted as a private in the Australian Imperial Force (AIF) in early 1916, and joined the 43rd Battalion. His unit deployed to the Western Front in France and Belgium in late December. After a bout of illness, Weathers returned to his battalion in time to take part in the Battle of Messines in June 1917, during which he was wounded. Evacuated to the United Kingdom, he rejoined his unit in early December.

Promoted to lance corporal in March 1918, Weathers fought with his battalion during the German spring offensive, but was gassed in May and did not return to his unit until the following month. He participated in the Battle of Hamel in July, the Battle of Amiens in August, and the Battle of Mont Saint-Quentin in September. At Mont Saint-Quentin he was recommended for the award of the Victoria Cross. Promoted to temporary corporal, he was mortally wounded in the head by a shell on 29 September during the Battle of St Quentin Canal, and died soon after, unaware that he was to receive the Victoria Cross, which was not announced until late December. Until 2016, his Victoria Cross was in private hands, but in that year it was purchased at auction and donated to the Australian War Memorial in Canberra, where it is displayed in the Hall of Valour.

== Early life ==
Lawrence Carthage Weathers was born in Te Kōpuru, near Dargaville, New Zealand, on 14 May 1890, one of eight children of John Joseph Weathers, a pastoralist, and his wife Ellen Frances Johanna née McCormack. Both his parents were from Adelaide, South Australia, and the family returned there when he was seven years old. They settled in the rural mid-north of the state and Weathers attended Snowtown Public School. After leaving school, in 1909 he and two of his brothers travelled to Europe and America, including a four-month stay in England. Having spent two years away, he returned to Australia and worked as a horse handler, coachman, and as an undertaker in Adelaide. On 10 September 1913, he married Annie Elizabeth "Tess" Watson of Unley. The couple lived in the suburbs of Yatala and Parkside, and had two children. Weathers' elder brother Thomas enlisted to serve in World War I and died of wounds during the Gallipoli Campaign of 1915, while serving with the 9th Light Horse Regiment. His younger brother Joseph also enlisted, but was discharged at his own request before leaving Australia.

== World War I ==
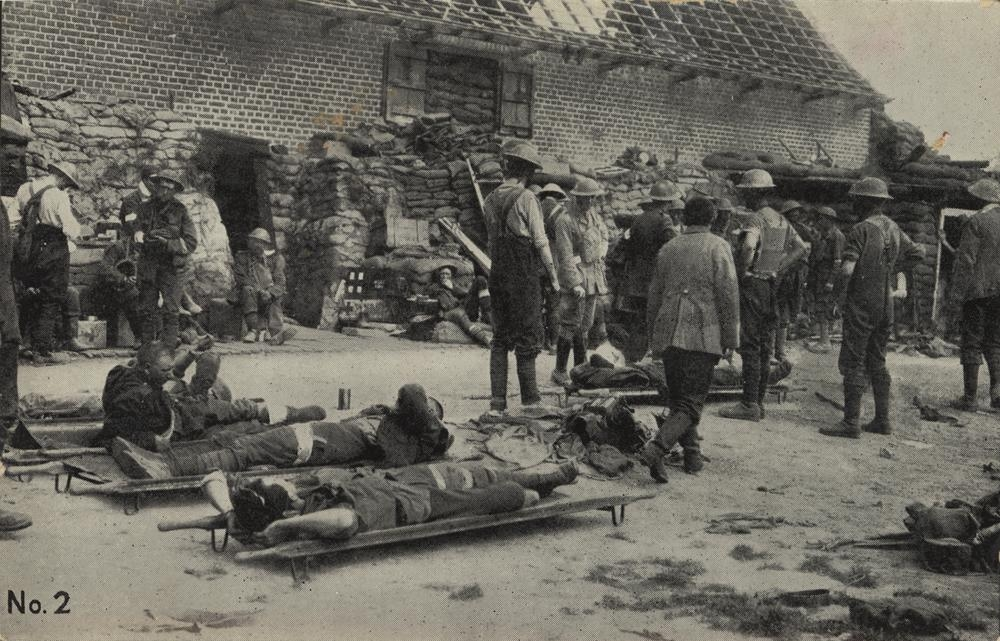
Casualties at a dressing station at Messines in June 1917

On 8 February 1916, Weathers enlisted as a private in the Australian Imperial Force (AIF), and was initially allocated as a reinforcement to the 10th Battalion. In June, he was transferred to the 43rd Battalion, part of the 11th Brigade, 3rd Division. The 43rd Battalion embarked on HMAT A19 (formerly SS Afric) in June 1916, and after a brief stop in the Middle East and transit through France, spent the rest of the year training at Larkhill on the Salisbury Plain in southern England. The 3rd Division embarked for the Western Front in November, and entered the trenches for the first time in late December. Weathers reported sick in late January 1917, and did not rejoin his unit until late April. He returned to the front lines in time to participate in the first major action his battalion saw in the war, the Battle of Messines, during which the 43rd Battalion incurred 122 casualties in a night-time operation to capture the final objective, the Oosttaverne Line. One of those casualties was Weathers, who suffered a gunshot wound to the leg on 10 June. Evacuated to hospital in the United Kingdom, he did not return to his unit until early December. The 3rd Division spent the winter of 1917–1918 rotating through the front lines in the Messines sector of the Flanders region of Belgium, largely improving the trenches against an expected German offensive in the spring.

Weathers was promoted to lance corporal on 21 March 1918, and a week later his battalion helped blunt the German spring offensive, taking up defensive positions between the Ancre and the Somme rivers west of Morlancourt. In late May he required medical treatment following a gas attack near Villers-Bretonneux that caused 230 casualties among the 43rd, and Weathers did not return to duty until mid-June.

The 43rd Battalion's next major action was the highly successful Battle of Hamel on 4 July. The battalion was responsible for clearing the village itself and suffered 97 casualties. The 43rd played a supporting role in the first phase of the Battle of Amiens on 8 August, which marked the beginning of the Hundred Days Offensive to drive the Germans back to the Hindenburg Line of fortifications. This included fighting west of Suzanne on 25–26 August. On 2 September, during the Battle of Mont Saint-Quentin, the 43rd Battalion was tasked with clearing trenches north of the village of Allaines. It captured Graz Trench opposite Allaines without a fight, then using hand grenades (known as bombs), fought northwards towards Scutari Trench, and succeeded in containing about 150 Germans at a fork in the trench. Faced with a deluge of German fire, the troops halted and a deadlock ensued, which was broken by Weathers, supported by three other men. His actions on that day resulted in a recommendation for the award of the Victoria Cross, the highest award for gallantry in battle that could be awarded to a member of the Australian armed forces at the time. The citation read:

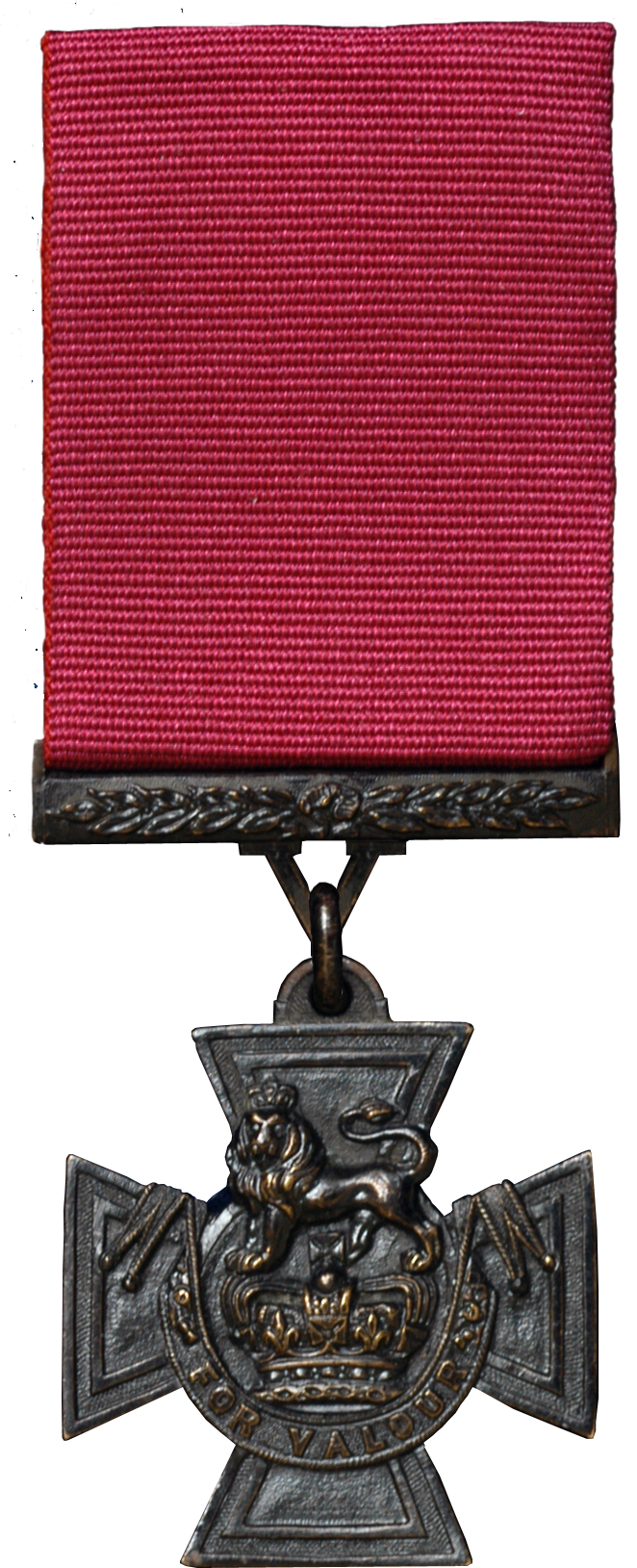
The Victoria Cross

For most conspicuous gallantry and devotion to duty on the 2nd of September 1918, north of Peronne, when with an advanced bombing party. The attack having been held up by a strongly-held trench, Corporal Weathers went forward alone, under heavy fire, and attacked the enemy with bombs. Then, returning to our lines for a further supply of bombs, he again went forward with three comrades and attacked under very heavy fire. Regardless of personal danger, he mounted the enemy parapet and bombed the trench, and, with the support of his comrades, captured 180 prisoners and three machine guns. His valour and determination resulted in the successful capture of the final objective, and saved the lives of many of his comrades.

When Weathers returned to his comrades, his uniform was covered in mud, he had blood running down his face, and he had five days' stubble on his chin. He was also festooned "like a Christmas tree" with looted German binoculars and pistols. Full of nervous tension, he chattered to his mates about how he had "put the wind up" the Germans. During the Battle of Mont Saint-Quentin, the 43rd Battalion suffered 67 casualties. Over the next week, the 11th Brigade was part of the pursuit of the Germans to the main Hindenburg Line. Weathers was promoted to temporary corporal on 10 September. On 29 September, the 3rd Division was part of the Battle of St Quentin Canal, one of the last Australian ground actions of the war, which involved breaching the Beaurevoir Line, the third line of defences of the Hindenburg Line. During the battle, the 43rd Battalion was sheltering in a trench when a shell burst among a small group of men, wounding Weathers in the head. He died soon after, not knowing he would receive the Victoria Cross, which was gazetted on 24 December 1918. The same shell killed his uncle, Lance Corporal J. J. Weathers.

Weathers was buried at the Commonwealth War Graves Commission Unicorn Cemetery, Vendhuile. Until 2016, his Victoria Cross was in private hands, but in that year it was put up for auction in Sydney, fetching a world record price for an individual medal. Late that year it was donated to the Australian War Memorial in Canberra, where it is now displayed in the Hall of Valour.
