= 43rd Battalion (Australia) =

Infantry battalion of the Australian Army

- Active: 1916–1919; 1921–1930; 1942–1944
- Country: Australia
- Branch: Australian Army
- Type: Infantry
- Size: ~900–1,000 men
- Part of: 11th Brigade; 3rd Brigade
- Nickname: The Hindmarsh Regiment
- Motto: Nil Desperandum
- Engagements: First World War: Western Front

Insignia
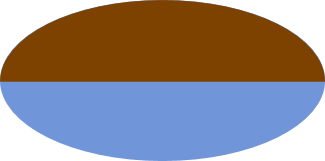
- Unit colour patch

The 43rd Battalion was an Australian Army infantry unit that was originally formed during the First World War as part of the all-volunteer Australian Imperial Force. Raised in early 1916, the battalion subsequently fought in the trenches of the Western Front from late 1916 until the end of the war in November 1918. After the war, the 43rd was re-raised as a part-time unit in South Australia, serving until 1930 when it was merged with the 48th Battalion. During the Second World War, the 43rd was briefly re-raised between 1942 and 1944, but did not see action before it was disbanded. After the war, the 43rd and 48th were once again merged, existing until 1960 when they became part of the Royal South Australia Regiment.

== History ==
=== First World War ===
The 43rd Battalion was raised on 7 March 1916, in Australia during the expansion of Australian Imperial Force (AIF), which took place at the end of the Gallipoli Campaign. Assigned to the 11th Brigade, it formed part of the 3rd Division, and was raised from volunteers drawn mainly from the state of South Australia. With an authorised strength of 1,023 men, after a period of rudimentary training in Australia, under the command of Lieutenant Colonel Douglas Gordon, the 43rd Battalion departed Australia in June 1916 aboard the transport Afric, bound for the United Kingdom. Sailing via Egypt, they undertook further training on Salisbury Plain, before the 3rd Division was sent to France in late 1916, where they joined the other four infantry divisions of the AIF.

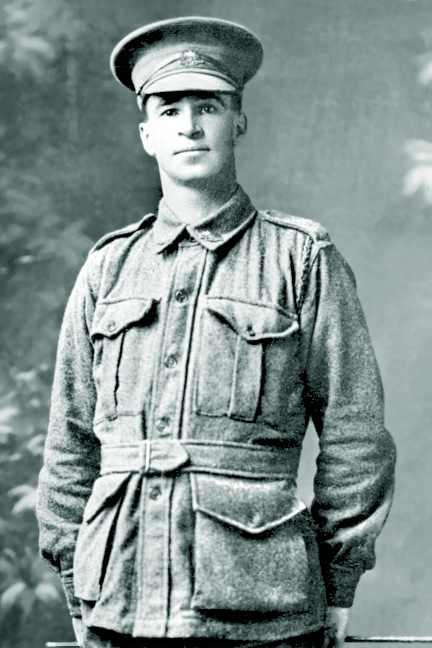
Lawrence Weathers, the 43rd Battalion's sole Victoria Cross recipient.

For the next two years, the battalion fought in the trenches along the Western Front in France and Belgium, taking part in several major battles. Its first significant action came during the Battle of Messines in June 1917, as part of the successful, but costly, effort to capture the Wytschaete–Messines Ridge near the salient that had developed in the frontline around Ypres. Later, in October 1917, the 43rd took part the Third Battle of Ypres, attacking around Broodseinde at the start of the month and then around Passchendaele a week later. During the fighting around Broodseinde, the 43rd formed part of the 3rd Division's spearhead and was successful in helping them advance over 2,000 yards (1,800 m), while during the attack on Passchendaele the battalion formed part of the divisional reserve along with the rest of the 11th Brigade and was committed to the front line late after the assaulting forces were forced to retire after their initial gains were negated by German attacks on the division's flank.

In early 1918, after the collapse of Tsarist Russia enabled a significant shift of German combat power from the Eastern Front to the Western Front, the Germans launched their Spring Offensive. The opening blows fell against the British in the Somme and as the offensive gained momentum, the Allies were pushed back significantly. With the vital rail head of Amiens threatened, the Australian units which had wintered in Belgium were brought south to the Somme to help stem the tide of the German advance. The 43rd Battalion subsequently undertook several defensive actions including one around Morlancourt. After the German offensive was halted, as the Allies sought to regain the initiative, they took part in the Battle of Hamel in July, where the battalion attacked in the centre of the 11th Brigade, tasked with securing the village itself. In August, the 43rd joined the Allied Hundred Days Offensive after which it took part in several attacks against the Hindenburg Line in the final months of the war. One of the battalion's last actions came at the Battle of Mont Saint-Quentin in September 1918. For his actions during this battle Corporal Lawrence Weathers was awarded the Victoria Cross, the only member of the 43rd Battalion to be bestowed this honour, receiving it for attacking two German trenches with grenades during an assault on the Bouchavesnes Ridge on 2 September 1918.

In early October 1918, the Australian Corps, which had suffered heavily during the fighting earlier in the year, was withdrawn from the line for rest and reorganisation and did not return to the front before the armistice was signed in November. After the war, the 43rd Battalion was disbanded in 1919 and its surviving personnel repatriated back to Australia. During the course of the war, the battalion suffered the following casualties: 386 killed and 1,321 wounded. Between June 1916 and March 1918, eight batches of reinforcements were dispatched to the 43rd Battalion from Australia. The 43rd Battalion's contribution to the Australian effort on the Western Front was recognised by the awarding of 15 battle honours in 1927.

=== Inter-war years and subsequent service ===
Australia's part-time military force, the Citizen Force, was reorganised in 1921 to perpetuate the numerical designations and divisional structure of the AIF. As a result, the 43rd Battalion was re-raised within the 4th Military District in South Australia where it formed part of the 3rd Brigade, headquartered at Keswick Barracks. Upon formation, the battalion drew its personnel mainly from the 2nd Battalion, 43rd Infantry Regiment as well as elements of several other units including the 10th, 48th and 50th Infantry Regiments, which had been formed in 1912 following the establishment of the Universal Training Scheme.

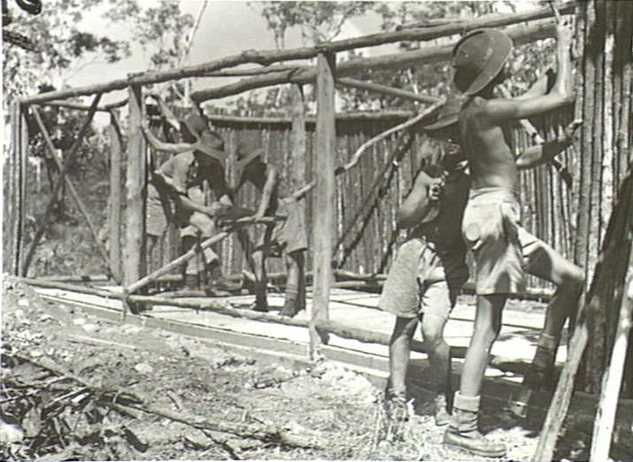
Soldiers from the 43rd Battalion at Berry Springs, Northern Territory, in November 1942

When territorial designations were introduced in 1927, the battalion adopted the title of the "Hindmarsh Regiment". It also adopted the motto of Nil Desperandum at this time and formed an alliance with the Oxfordshire and Buckinghamshire Light Infantry. In 1930, after the newly elected James Scullin Labor government suspended compulsory training, the battalion was amalgamated with the 48th Battalion. The two units remained linked until 27 August 1942, when they were re-raised in their own right as part of the expansion of the Australian military during the Second World War. It was subsequently deployed to the Northern Territory as part of the 3rd and 23rd Brigades. Nevertheless, the 43rd Battalion did not see action during the war and was disbanded on 6 April 1944.

After the war, when Australia's military was reorganised the 43rd Battalion was reformed once again as an amalgamated unit known as the 43rd/48th Battalion, which remained in existence until 1960 when it was subsumed into the Royal South Australia Regiment (RSAR), following a reorganisation that saw the creation of six multi-battalion state-based regiments within the Citizen Military Forces. In 1961, the battalion was entrusted with the 14 battle honours awarded to the 2/43rd Battalion for their involvement in the fighting in North Africa and the South-West Pacific during the Second World War. Although it currently no longer exists, for a period after 1966, following the reintroduction of national service, the 43rd Battalion was re-raised within the RSAR, as a remote area battalion within the Citizens Military Force, offering special conditions of service for soldiers who had elected to serve in the CMF rather than the Regular Army, but who could not meet their training requirements through normal attendance due to their occupation or place of residence.

== Battle honours ==
The 43rd Battalion was awarded the following battle honours:

- First World War: Messines, 1917; Ypres, 1917; Polygon Wood; Broodseinde; Poelcappelle; Passchendaele; Somme, 1918; Ancre, 1918; Hamel; Amiens; Albert, 1918; Mont St. Quentin; Hindenburg Line; St. Quentin Canal; and France and Flanders, 1916–18.
- Second World War: North Africa 1941–42; Defence of Tobruk; Defence of the Alamein Line; Tel el Makh Khad; El Alamein; South West Pacific 1943–45; Lae–Nadzab; Busu River; Finschhafen; Defence of Scarlet Beach; Pabu; Borneo; Labuan; and Beaufort (inherited).
