= Adelaide Regiment of Volunteer Rifles =

- Active: 1860–1865 1866–1870 1877–1901
- Allegiance: Colony of South Australia
- Type: Infantry

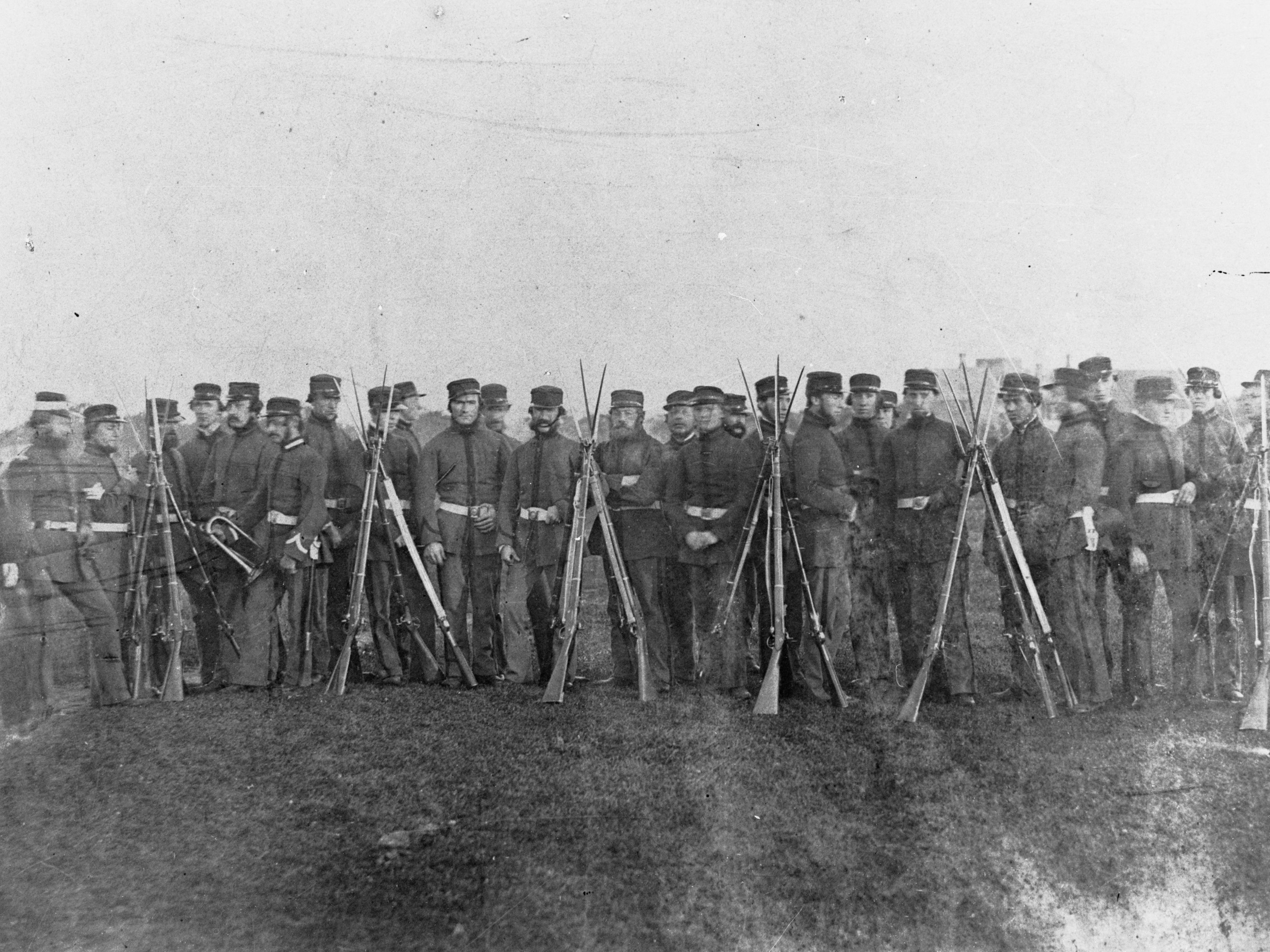
Eastern Suburban Rifle Company, 1860

The Adelaide Regiment of Volunteer Rifles was an infantry regiment of the Colony of South Australia. It was formed in 1860, as the Adelaide Regiment, following the amalgamation of a number of rifle companies. It continued to exist periodically throughout the 19th century until the Federation of Australia.

== History ==
=== Origin ===
The initial legislation that enable the formation of the Regiment, was the Act No. 2 of 1854, entitled "An Act to organize and establish a Volunteer Military Force in South Australia".

In 1859, a number of volunteer rifle companies were raised in various locations across the South Australian colony, and were formed in response to the same reasons as the Volunteer Force in Great Britain.

=== Formation ===
In May 1860, the Adelaide Regiment was raised, and consisted of 20 individual rifle companies that were previously raised before their amalgamation into the regiment. In February 1865 the Hindmarsh Rifle company was added to the Regiment.

In 1861, the regiment was reorganised, with the number of companies being reduced to thirteen.

in 1865, the regiment was re-organised under Act No. 18 of 1865, entitled the "Volunteer Act 1865–66", wherein companies, although still organised by location, were numbered.

== Lineage ==
The original volunteer companies that were amalgamated include:

- Port Adelaide Rifles
- Munno Para East Rifles
- 1st Adelaide Rifles
- Glenelg Rifles
- Glen Osmond Rifles
- West Adelaide Rifles
- Mitcham Rifles
- Adelaide Marksmen
- Sturt and Brighton Rifles
- Edwardstown Rifles
- Gawler Rifles
- Nairne Rifles
- Noarlunga Rifles

The companies that were originally a part of the regiment, but were disbanded, include:

- Adelaide Rifles
- Eastern Suburban Rifles
- Kent Rifles
- Alberton and Queenstown Rifles
- Kensington and Norwood Rifles
- Brighton Rifles
- First Gawler Rifles
- Second Gawler Rifles
- Salisbury Rifles
- Smithfield Rifles

Following the Australian Federation, the regiment continued as the 1st Regiment Adelaide Rifles until 1903 when it spawned the following units:

- 10th (Adelaide Rifles) Australian Infantry Regiment, 1903–1911
- 78th (Adelaide Rifles) Battalion, 1911–1921
- 10th (Adelaide Rifles) Battalion, periodically from 1921 to 1987
- 10th/27th Battalion, Royal South Australian Regiment, 1987–present

== Commanders ==
The regiment was only commanded by two officers before it was disbanded

- Lieutenant-Colonel B. T. Finniss, May 1860 – August 1863
- Lieutenant-Colonel George Mayo, August 1863

== Bibliography ==
- Gray, Robert (1957). "Regiments Raised In South Australia 1840–1937". Journal of the Society for Army Historical Research. 35 (144): 165–169. JSTOR 44226814.
