= Vendhuile =

- Commune
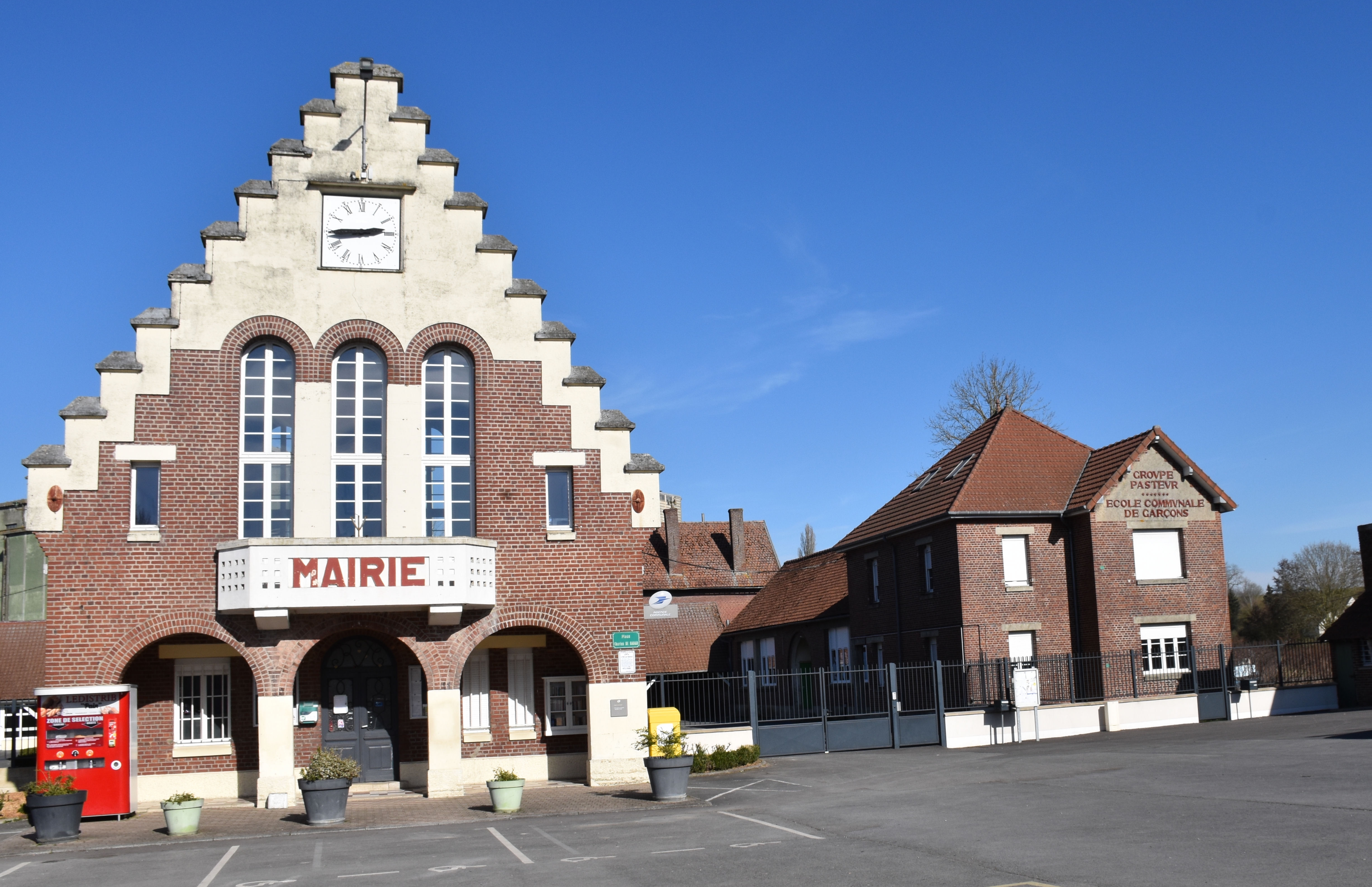
- Town hall
- Location of Vendhuile
- Location within France Location within Hauts-de-France
- Coordinates: 50°00′39″N 3°12′33″E
- Country: France
- Region: Hauts-de-France
- Department: Aisne
- Arrondissement: Saint-Quentin
- Canton: Bohain-en-Vermandois
- Intercommunality: Pays du Vermandois

Government
  - Mayor (2026–32): Xavier Passet
- Area^{1}: 10.96 km^{2} (4.23 sq mi)
- Elevation: 86 m (282 ft)
- Highest elevation: 143 m (469 ft)
- Lowest elevation: 83 m (272 ft)
- Population (2023): 585
  - Density: 53.4/km^{2} (138/sq mi)
- Time zone: UTC+01:00 (CET)
  - Summer (DST): UTC+02:00 (CEST)
- INSEE/Postal code: 02776 /02420
- ^{1} French Land Register data, which excludes lakes, ponds, glaciers > 1 km^{2} (0.386 sq mi or 247 acres) and river estuaries.

Vendhuile (French pronunciation: [vɑ̃dɥil]) is a commune in the Aisne department in Hauts-de-France in northern France. It received the Croix de guerre for its suffering in World War I.

== Geography ==
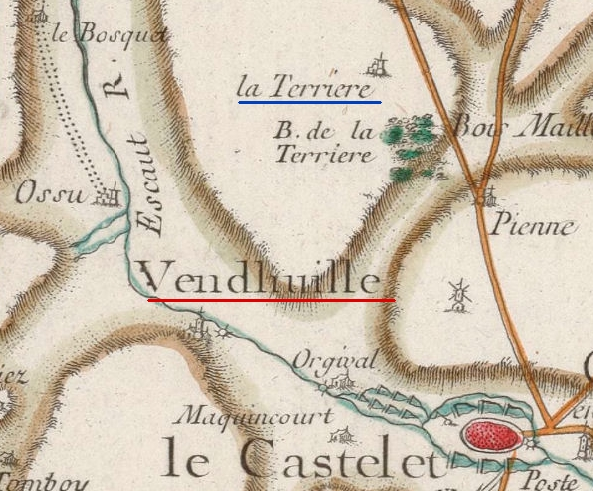
Cassini map of this area (around 1750)

The hamlet of La Terrière, just under 5 kilometres (3.1 mi) to the northeast, which includes around forty houses and a church, is part of Vendhuile as to 1/4, and the rest is in the commune of Honnecourt-sur-Escaut in Nord.

== Town planning ==
According to the terms of Insee and its zoning published in 2020, Vendhuile is a rural municipality, as it does not belong to any urban unit. The municipality is part of the functional area (aire d'attraction, commuting zone) of Saint-Quentin.

== History ==
=== Toponymy ===
Soldile appears in 1148 under the name of Vendulia in a cartulary of the Abbey of Mont-Saint-Martin then Vendulium, Soldile, Soldille, Soldile-en-l'Empire, Vendhuille-Cambrésis, Vendhuille sur Cambrésis, Vendhuille on the Cassini map around 1750, and the current Vendhuile spelling at the end of the 18th century.

=== 18th century map ===
The pre-Revolutionary Cassini map above shows that Vendhuile lying on the Scheldt (Escaut). A water mill symbolized by a toothed wheel was on the river.

To the north, La Terrière is a hamlet (subsidiary place without a church).

=== World War I ===
Due to the commune's involvement in the first world war the Commonwealth War Graves Commission set up Unicorn Cemetery in the commune where allied soldiers who fought in WW1 are buried, among them is Victoria Cross recipient Lawrence Weathers.

== Politics and administration ==
The commune of Vendhuile is a member of the Intercommunalité of Pays du Vermandois, a Public Establishment for Inter-municipal Cooperation (EPCI) with its own tax system created on 31 December 1993 whose head office is at Bellicourt.

Administratively, it is in the arrondissement of Saint-Quentin, in the department of Aisne and the region of Hauts-de-France.

== See also ==
- Communes of the Aisne department
- Croix de guerre 1914–1918 (France)

== Sources ==
- Wigmore, Lionel; Harding, Bruce A. (1986). Williams, Jeff; Staunton, Anthony (eds.). They Dared Mightily (2 ed.). Canberra, Australian Capital Territory: Australian War Memorial. ISBN 978-0-642-99471-4.
