= Canton of Bray-sur-Somme =

Coordinates: 49°56′28″N 2°43′6″E

Bray-sur-Somme
- Former canton
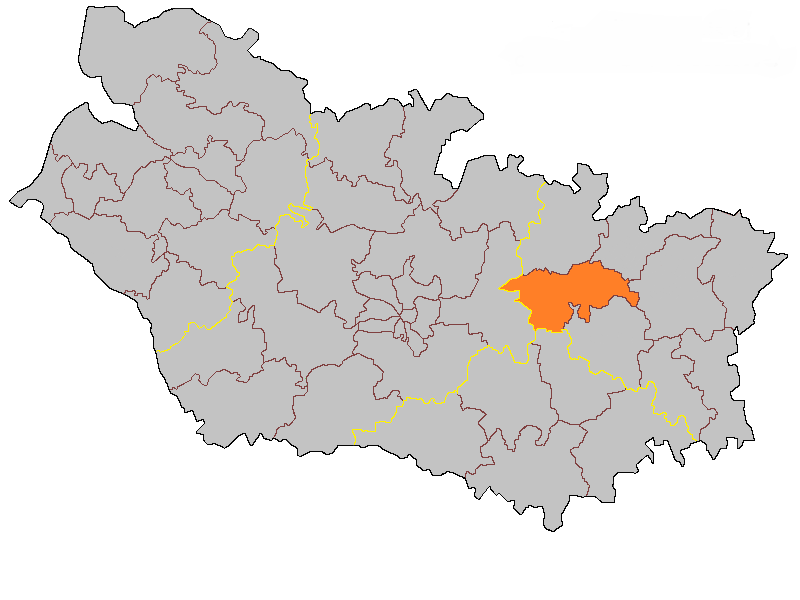
- Interactive map of Bray-sur-Somme
- Country: France
- Region: Hauts-de-France
- Department: Somme
- No. of communes: {{{nbcomm}}}
- Disbanded: 2015
- Area: 146.96 km^{2} (56.74 sq mi)
- Population (2012): 6,463
  - Density: 43.98/km^{2} (113.9/sq mi)

The Canton of Bray-sur-Somme is a former canton situated in the department of the Somme and in the Picardy region of northern France. It was disbanded following the French canton reorganisation which came into effect in March 2015. It had 6,463 inhabitants (2012).

== Geography ==
The canton is organised around the commune of Bray-sur-Somme in the arrondissement of Péronne. The altitude varies from 27m (Sailly-le-Sec) to 123m (Suzanne) for an average of 53m.

The canton comprised 19 communes:

- Bray-sur-Somme
- Cappy
- Cerisy
- Chipilly
- Chuignolles
- Éclusier-Vaux
- Étinehem
- Frise
- Herbécourt
- Méricourt-l'Abbé
- Méricourt-sur-Somme
- Morcourt
- Morlancourt
- La Neuville-lès-Bray
- Sailly-Laurette
- Sailly-le-Sec
- Suzanne
- Treux
- Ville-sur-Ancre

== Population ==
Population Growth
1962	1968	1975	1982	1990	1999
5095	5404	5207	5284	5555	5754
Census count starting from 1962 : Population without double counting

== See also ==
- Arrondissements of the Somme department
- Cantons of the Somme department
- Communes of the Somme department
