= Vaire-sous-Corbie =

- Commune
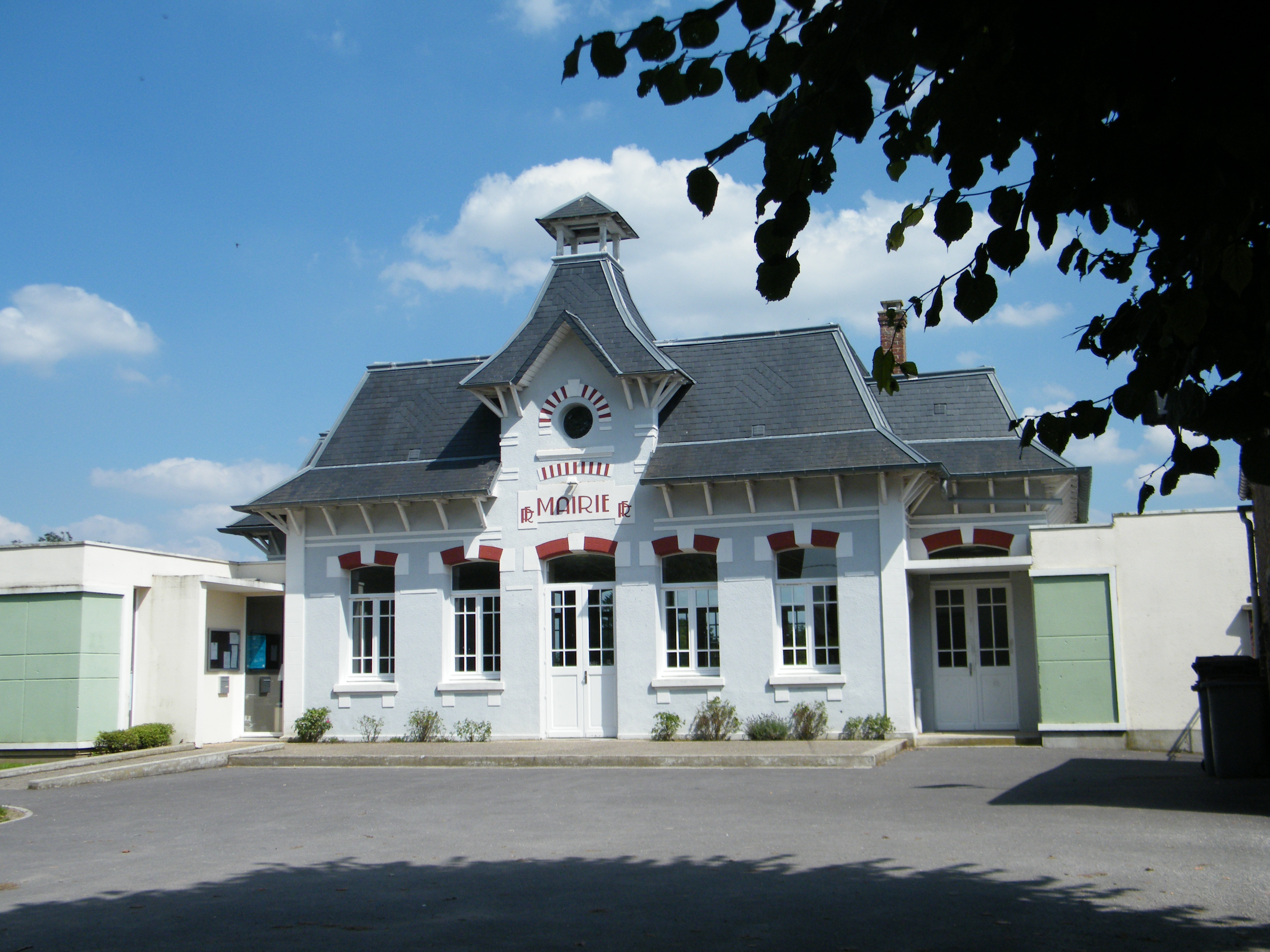
- The town hall in Vaire-sous-Corbie
- Location of Vaire-sous-Corbie
- Location within France Location within Hauts-de-France
- Coordinates: 49°55′00″N 2°32′47″E
- Country: France
- Region: Hauts-de-France
- Department: Somme
- Arrondissement: Amiens
- Canton: Corbie
- Intercommunality: Val de Somme

Government
  - Mayor (2020–2026): Daniel Van Den Hove
- Area^{1}: 6.74 km^{2} (2.60 sq mi)
- Elevation: 36 m (118 ft)
- Highest elevation: 104 m (341 ft)
- Lowest elevation: 27 m (89 ft)
- Population (2023): 288
  - Density: 42.7/km^{2} (111/sq mi)
- Time zone: UTC+01:00 (CET)
  - Summer (DST): UTC+02:00 (CEST)
- INSEE/Postal code: 80774 /80800
- ^{1} French Land Register data, which excludes lakes, ponds, glaciers > 1 km^{2} (0.386 sq mi or 247 acres) and river estuaries.

Vaire-sous-Corbie (French pronunciation: [vɛʁ su kɔʁbi], literally Vaire under Corbie; Picard: Vaire-dsou-Corbeu) is a commune in the Somme department in Hauts-de-France in northern France.

== Geography ==
The commune is situated 18 kilometres (11 mi) east of Amiens, on the D71 road and by the banks of the river Somme.

== Population ==
Historical population
| Year | Pop. | ±% p.a. |
|---|---|---|
| 1968 | 187 | — |
| 1975 | 189 | +0.15% |
| 1982 | 194 | +0.37% |
| 1990 | 232 | +2.26% |
| 1999 | 263 | +1.40% |
| 2007 | 262 | −0.05% |
| 2012 | 278 | +1.19% |
| 2017 | 288 | +0.71% |
| 2023 | 288 | +0.00% |
Source: INSEE

== See also ==
- Communes of the Somme department
