= Heilly =

- Commune
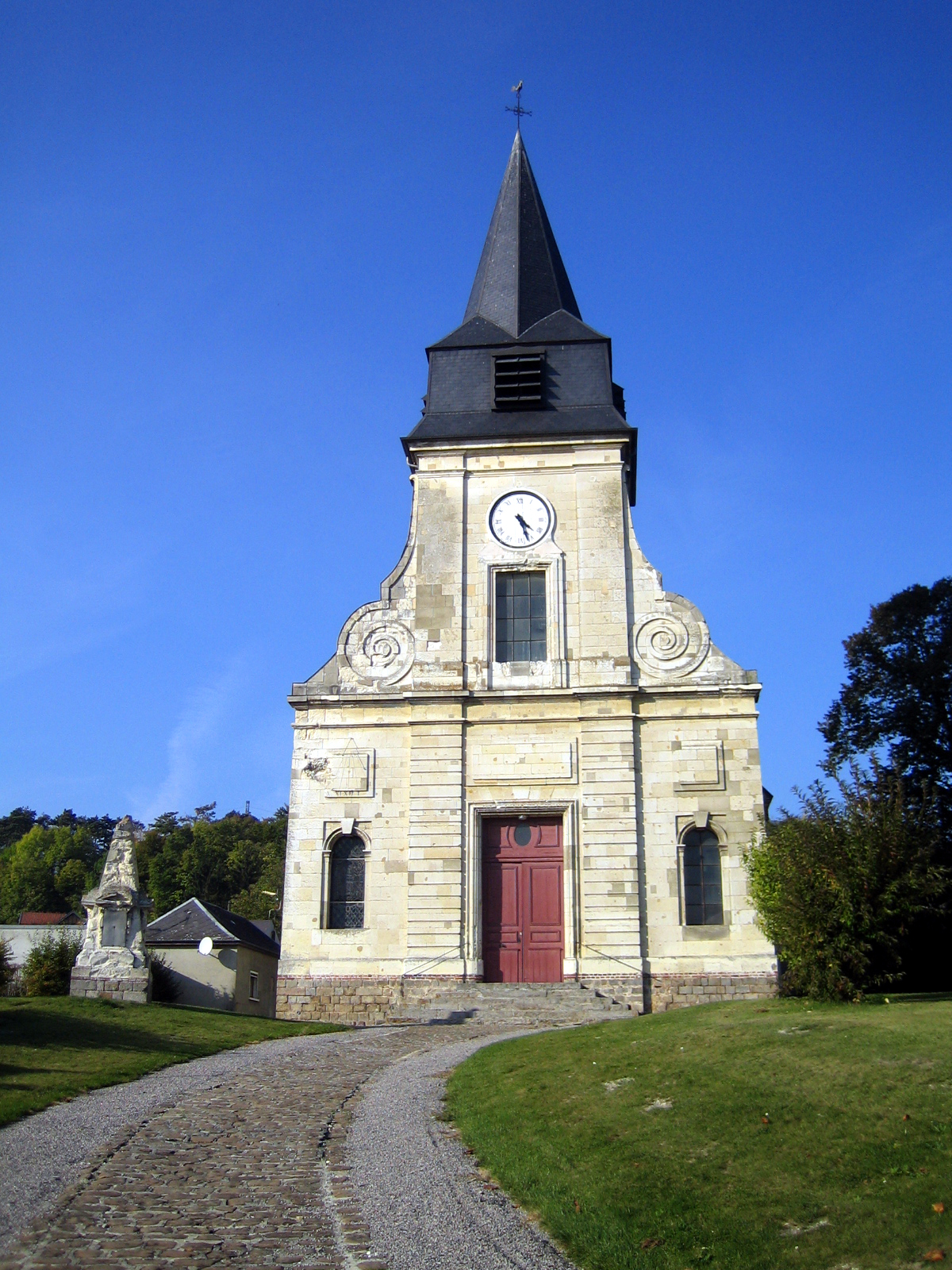
- The church in Heilly

- Coat of arms
- Location of Heilly
- Location within France Location within Hauts-de-France
- Coordinates: 49°57′15″N 2°32′16″E
- Country: France
- Region: Hauts-de-France
- Department: Somme
- Arrondissement: Amiens
- Canton: Corbie
- Intercommunality: Val de Somme

Government
  - Mayor (2020–2026): Hubert Fleury
- Area^{1}: 9.37 km^{2} (3.62 sq mi)
- Elevation: 38 m (125 ft)
- Highest elevation: 107 m (351 ft)
- Lowest elevation: 31 m (102 ft)
- Population (2023): 438
  - Density: 46.7/km^{2} (121/sq mi)
- Time zone: UTC+01:00 (CET)
  - Summer (DST): UTC+02:00 (CEST)
- INSEE/Postal code: 80426 /80800
- ^{1} French Land Register data, which excludes lakes, ponds, glaciers > 1 km^{2} (0.386 sq mi or 247 acres) and river estuaries.

Heilly (French pronunciation: [ɛji]; Picard: Heillin) is a commune in the Somme department in Hauts-de-France in northern France.

== Geography ==
Heilly is situated on the D52 road, some 12 miles (19 km) northeast of Amiens.

== History ==
During the First World War, being on the railway line Amiens-Albert led to a group of three Casualty Clearing Stations (CCSs) being set up around the railway station in preparation for the Battle of the Somme. The railway line allowed the use of Ambulance Trains to transport the wounded on to large hospitals further from the front lines. Just under 3000 graves are in the military cemetery, Heilly Station Cemetery, primarily of those who died in 1916. The cemetery, along with the sites of two of the original CCSs, are actually in the neighbouring commune of Méricourt-l'Abbé.

== Population ==
Historical population

Year	Pop.	±% p.a.
1841	794	—
1901	472	−0.86%
1962	367	−0.41%
1968	346	−0.98%
1975	343	−0.12%
1982	353	+0.41%

Year	Pop.	±% p.a.
1990	391	+1.29%
1999	399	+0.23%
2007	407	+0.25%
2012	390	−0.85%
2017	424	+1.69%
2023	438	+0.54%

Source: EHESS and INSEE (1968-2023)

== See also ==
- Communes of the Somme department
