= Communauté de communes du Val de Somme =

Federation of municipalities in France

Coordinates: 49.91°N 2.51°E

Val de Somme
- Communauté de communes
- Country: France
- Region: Hauts-de-France
- Department: Somme
- No. of communes: {{{nbcomm}}}
- Established: 1993

Government
  - President: Alain Babaut
- Area: 246.4 km^{2} (95.1 sq mi)
- Population (2018): 26,646
  - Density: 108.1/km^{2} (280.1/sq mi)
- Website: www.valdesomme.com

The Communauté de communes du Val de Somme is a communauté de communes in the Somme département and in the Hauts-de-France région of France. Its seat is Corbie. Its area is 246.4 km^{2}, and its population was 26,646 in 2018.

== Composition ==
The communauté de communes consists of the following 33 communes:

1. Aubigny
2. Baizieux
3. Bonnay
4. Bresle
5. Bussy-lès-Daours
6. Cachy
7. Cerisy
8. Chipilly
9. Corbie
10. Daours
11. Fouilloy
12. Franvillers
13. Gentelles
14. Hamelet
15. Heilly
16. Hénencourt
17. Lahoussoye
18. Lamotte-Brebière
19. Lamotte-Warfusée
20. Le Hamel
21. Marcelcave
22. Méricourt-l'Abbé
23. Morcourt
24. Pont-Noyelles
25. Ribemont-sur-Ancre
26. Sailly-Laurette
27. Sailly-le-Sec
28. Treux
29. Vaire-sous-Corbie
30. Vaux-sur-Somme
31. Vecquemont
32. Villers-Bretonneux
33. Warloy-Baillon

== See also ==
- Communes of the Somme department
