= Franvillers =

- Commune
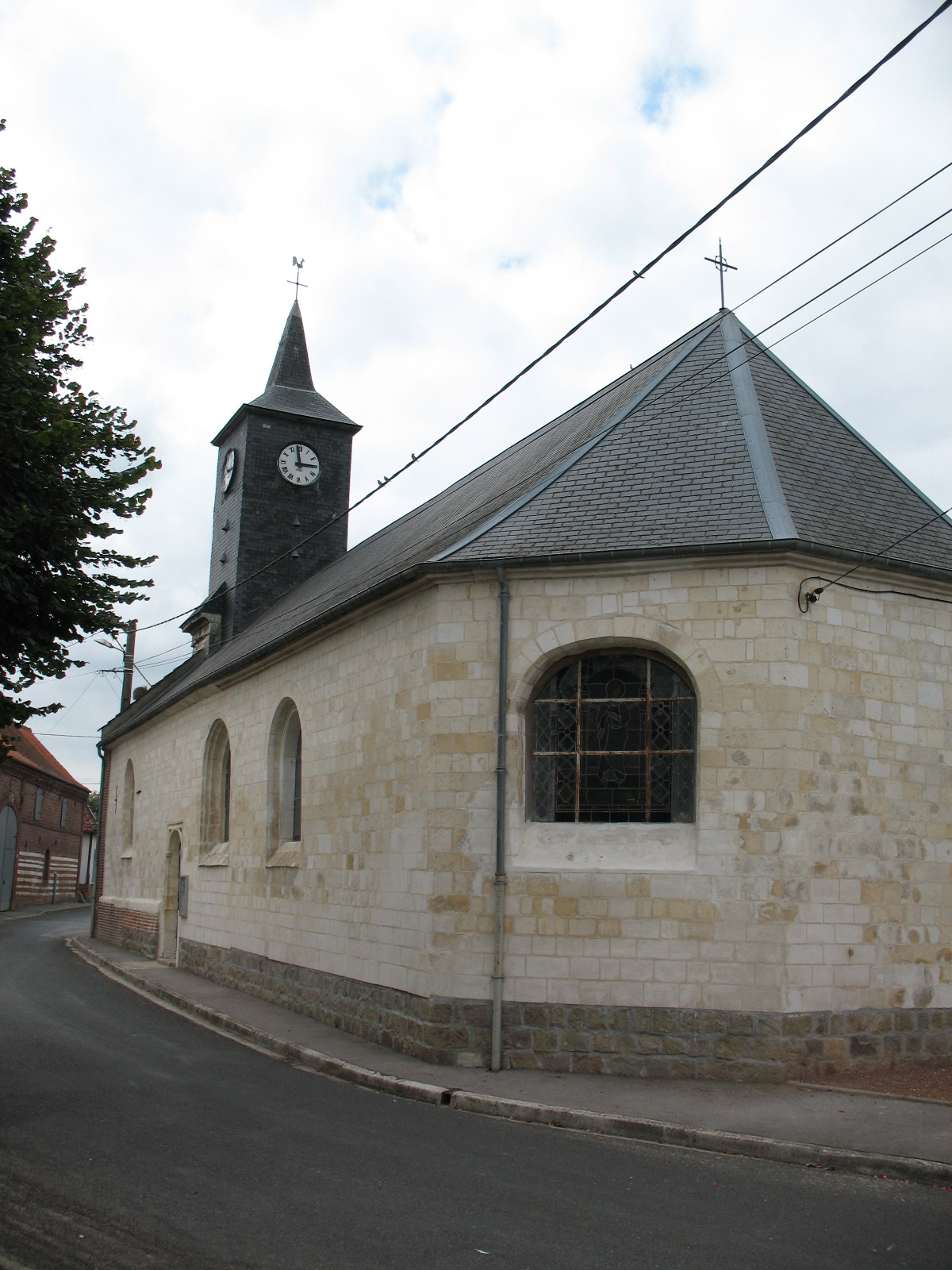
- The church in Franvillers

- Coat of arms
- Location of Franvillers
- Location within France Location within Hauts-de-France
- Coordinates: 49°58′01″N 2°30′29″E
- Country: France
- Region: Hauts-de-France
- Department: Somme
- Arrondissement: Amiens
- Canton: Corbie
- Intercommunality: Val de Somme

Government
  - Mayor (2020–2026): Delia Sanjuan
- Area^{1}: 4.77 km^{2} (1.84 sq mi)
- Elevation: 106 m (348 ft)
- Highest elevation: 121 m (397 ft)
- Lowest elevation: 87 m (285 ft)
- Population (2023): 558
  - Density: 117/km^{2} (303/sq mi)
- Time zone: UTC+01:00 (CET)
  - Summer (DST): UTC+02:00 (CEST)
- INSEE/Postal code: 80350 /80800
- ^{1} French Land Register data, which excludes lakes, ponds, glaciers > 1 km^{2} (0.386 sq mi or 247 acres) and river estuaries.

Franvillers is a commune in the Somme department in Hauts-de-France in northern France.

== Geography ==
Franvillers is situated 10 miles (16 km) northeast of Amiens at the junction of the D929 and D23 roads

== Population ==
Historical population
Year	Pop.	±% p.a.
1968	426	—
1975	427	+0.03%
1982	481	+1.72%
1990	519	+0.95%
1999	493	−0.57%
2007	493	+0.00%
2012	530	+1.46%
2017	513	−0.65%
2023	558	+1.41%
Source: INSEE

== Places of interest ==
- The war memorial

== See also ==
- Communes of the Somme department
