= Lamotte-Warfusée =

- Commune
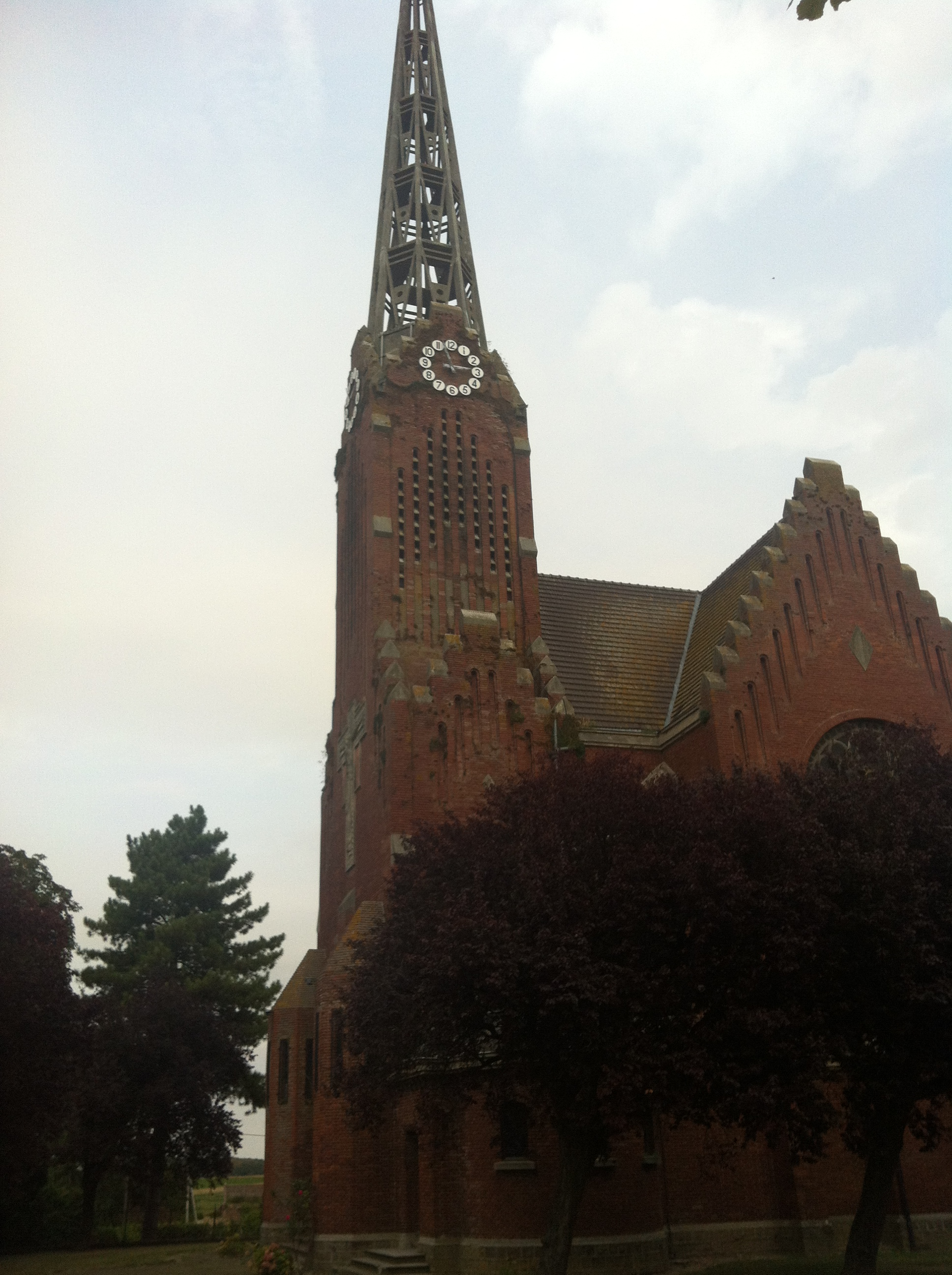
- The church in Lamotte-Warfusée
- Location of Lamotte-Warfusée
- Location within France Location within Hauts-de-France
- Coordinates: 49°52′20″N 2°35′46″E
- Country: France
- Region: Hauts-de-France
- Department: Somme
- Arrondissement: Amiens
- Canton: Corbie
- Intercommunality: Val de Somme

Government
  - Mayor (2020–2026): Frédéric Dehurtevent
- Area^{1}: 9.36 km^{2} (3.61 sq mi)
- Elevation: 77 m (253 ft)
- Highest elevation: 101 m (331 ft)
- Lowest elevation: 35 m (115 ft)
- Population (2023): 725
  - Density: 77.5/km^{2} (201/sq mi)
- Time zone: UTC+01:00 (CET)
  - Summer (DST): UTC+02:00 (CEST)
- INSEE/Postal code: 80463 /80800
- ^{1} French Land Register data, which excludes lakes, ponds, glaciers > 1 km^{2} (0.386 sq mi or 247 acres) and river estuaries.

Lamotte-Warfusée is a commune in the Somme department in Hauts-de-France in northern France.

== Geography ==
The commune is situated on the N29 road, some 16 miles (26 km) east of Amiens. Lamotte-Warfusée was created as a commune in 1974, by the joining of the ancient communes of Lamotte-en-Santerre and Warfusée-Abancourt.

== Population ==
Historical population
Year	Pop.	±% p.a.
1968	447	—
1975	436	−0.36%
1982	447	+0.36%
1990	481	+0.92%
1999	513	+0.72%
2007	565	+1.21%
2012	674	+3.59%
2017	703	+0.85%
2023	725	+0.51%
Source: INSEE

== See also ==
- Communes of the Somme department
