= Bonnay, Somme =

Bonnay
- Commune
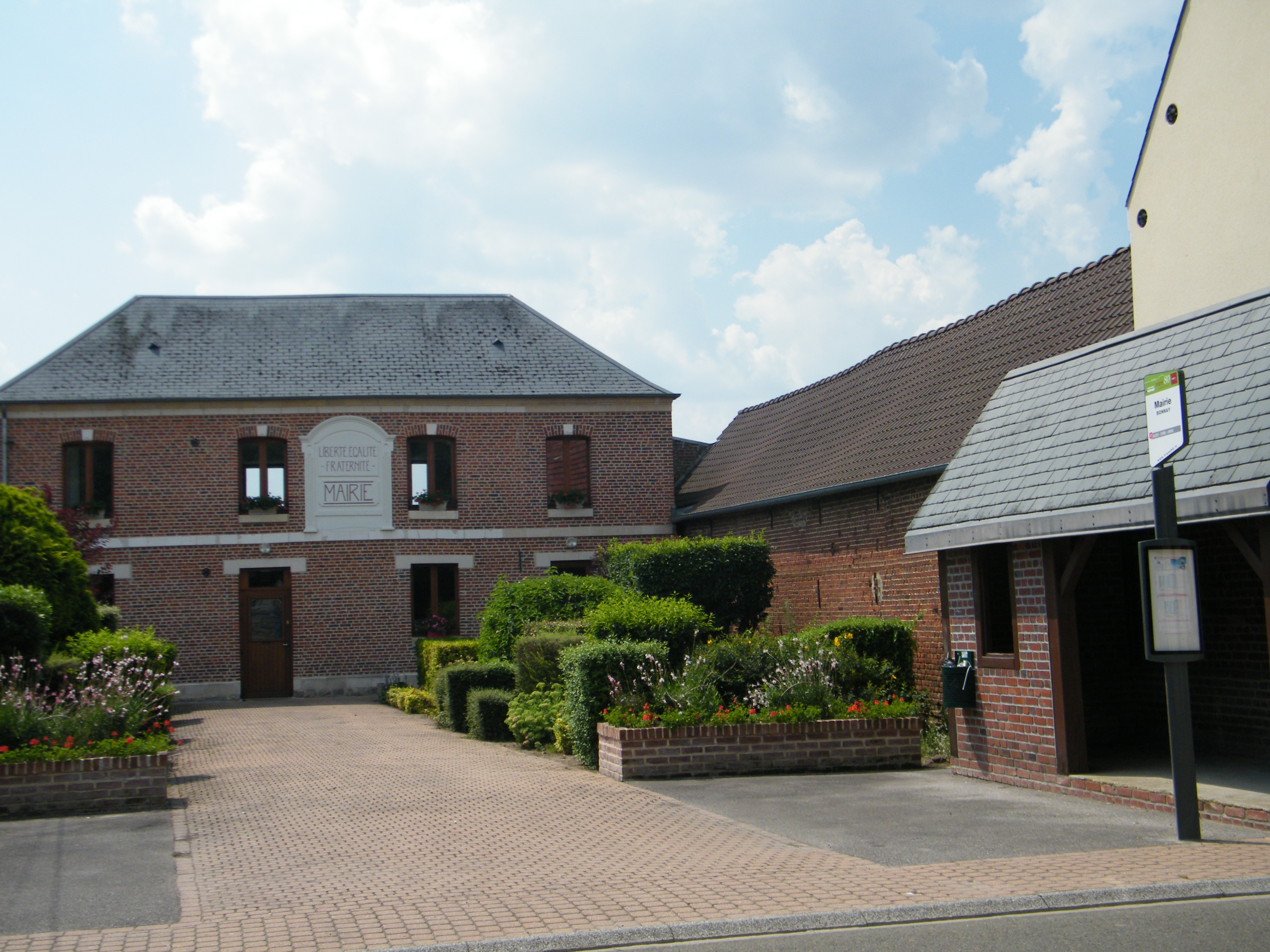
- The town hall in Bonnay
- Location of Bonnay
- Location within France Location within Hauts-de-France
- Coordinates: 49°55′35″N 2°30′43″E
- Country: France
- Region: Hauts-de-France
- Department: Somme
- Arrondissement: Amiens
- Canton: Corbie
- Intercommunality: Val de Somme

Government
  - Mayor (2020–2026): Denis Demarcy
- Area^{1}: 5.86 km^{2} (2.26 sq mi)
- Elevation: 34 m (112 ft)
- Highest elevation: 113 m (371 ft)
- Lowest elevation: 31 m (102 ft)
- Population (2023): 247
  - Density: 42.2/km^{2} (109/sq mi)
- Time zone: UTC+01:00 (CET)
  - Summer (DST): UTC+02:00 (CEST)
- INSEE/Postal code: 80112 /80800
- ^{1} French Land Register data, which excludes lakes, ponds, glaciers > 1 km^{2} (0.386 sq mi or 247 acres) and river estuaries.

Bonnay (French pronunciation: [bɔnɛ]) is a commune in the Somme department in Hauts-de-France in northern France.

== Geography ==
Bonnay is situated on the D23 road, some 10 miles (16 km) northeast of Amiens.

== Population ==
Historical population
Year	Pop.	±% p.a.
1968	222	—
1975	206	−1.06%
1982	202	−0.28%
1990	215	+0.78%
1999	251	+1.74%
2007	258	+0.34%
2012	241	−1.35%
2017	237	−0.33%
2023	247	+0.69%
Source: INSEE

== See also ==
- Communes of the Somme department
