= Ribemont-sur-Ancre =

- Commune
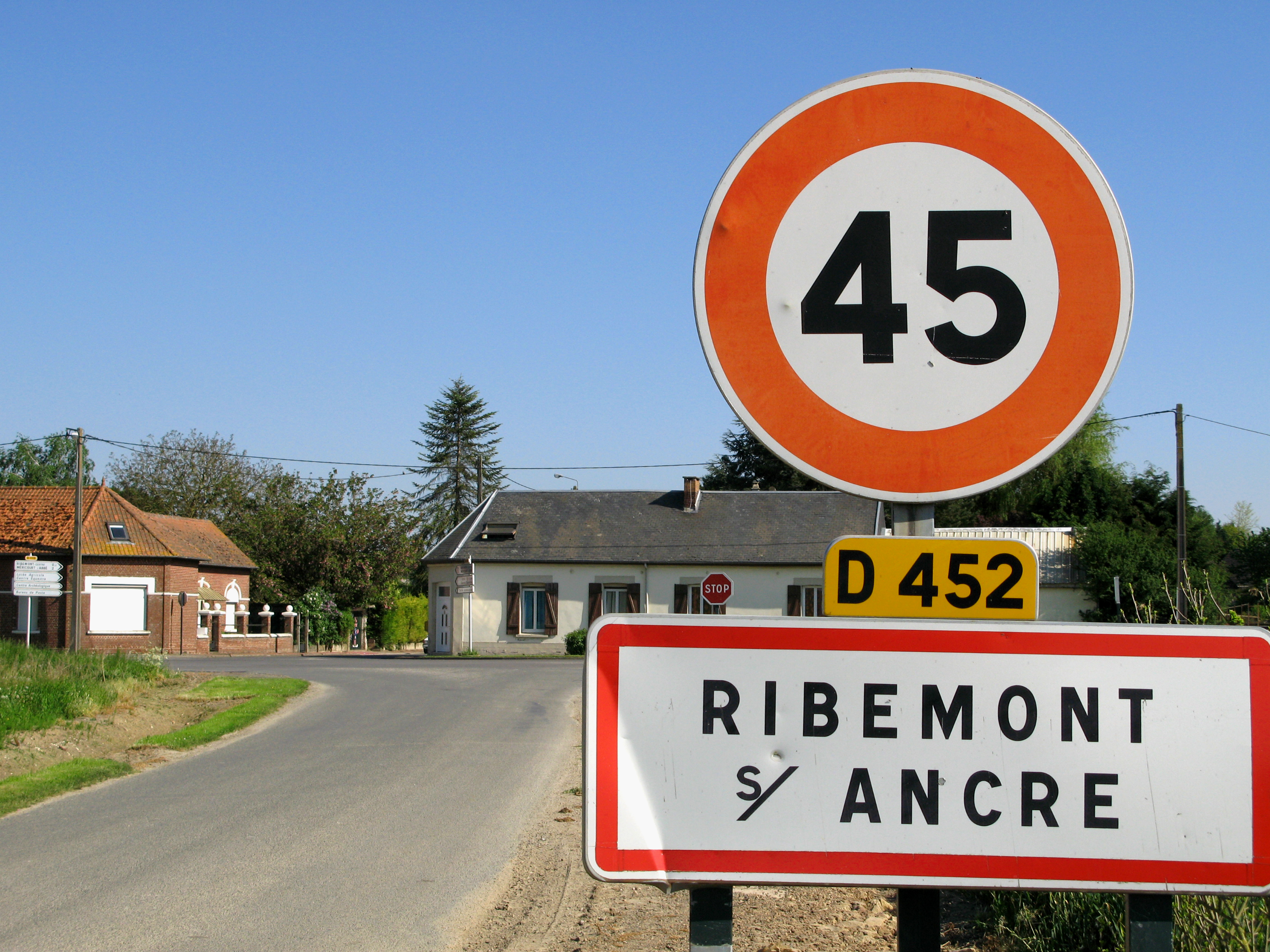
- The road into Ribemont-sur-Ancre
- Location of Ribemont-sur-Ancre
- Location within France Location within Hauts-de-France
- Coordinates: 49°57′39″N 2°33′59″E
- Country: France
- Region: Hauts-de-France
- Department: Somme
- Arrondissement: Amiens
- Canton: Corbie
- Intercommunality: Val de Somme

Government
  - Mayor (2022–2026): Hervé Leger
- Area^{1}: 9.23 km^{2} (3.56 sq mi)
- Elevation: 39 m (128 ft)
- Highest elevation: 115 m (377 ft)
- Lowest elevation: 32 m (105 ft)
- Population (2023): 609
  - Density: 66.0/km^{2} (171/sq mi)
- Time zone: UTC+01:00 (CET)
  - Summer (DST): UTC+02:00 (CEST)
- INSEE/Postal code: 80672 /80800
- ^{1} French Land Register data, which excludes lakes, ponds, glaciers > 1 km^{2} (0.386 sq mi or 247 acres) and river estuaries.

Ribemont-sur-Ancre (French pronunciation: [ʁibmɔ̃ syʁ ɑ̃kʁ]; Picard: Ribemont-su-Inke) is a commune in the Somme département in Hauts-de-France in northern France.

== Geography ==
The commune is situated 14 miles (23 km) northeast of Amiens, on the D119 road and by the banks of the river Ancre, a tributary of the Somme.

== Population ==
Historical population
Year	Pop.	±% p.a.
1968	476	—
1975	545	+1.95%
1982	577	+0.82%
1990	566	−0.24%
1999	616	+0.95%
2007	666	+0.98%
2012	603	−1.97%
2017	679	+2.40%
2023	609	−1.80%
Source: INSEE

== See also ==
- Communes of the Somme department
