= Chipilly =

- Commune
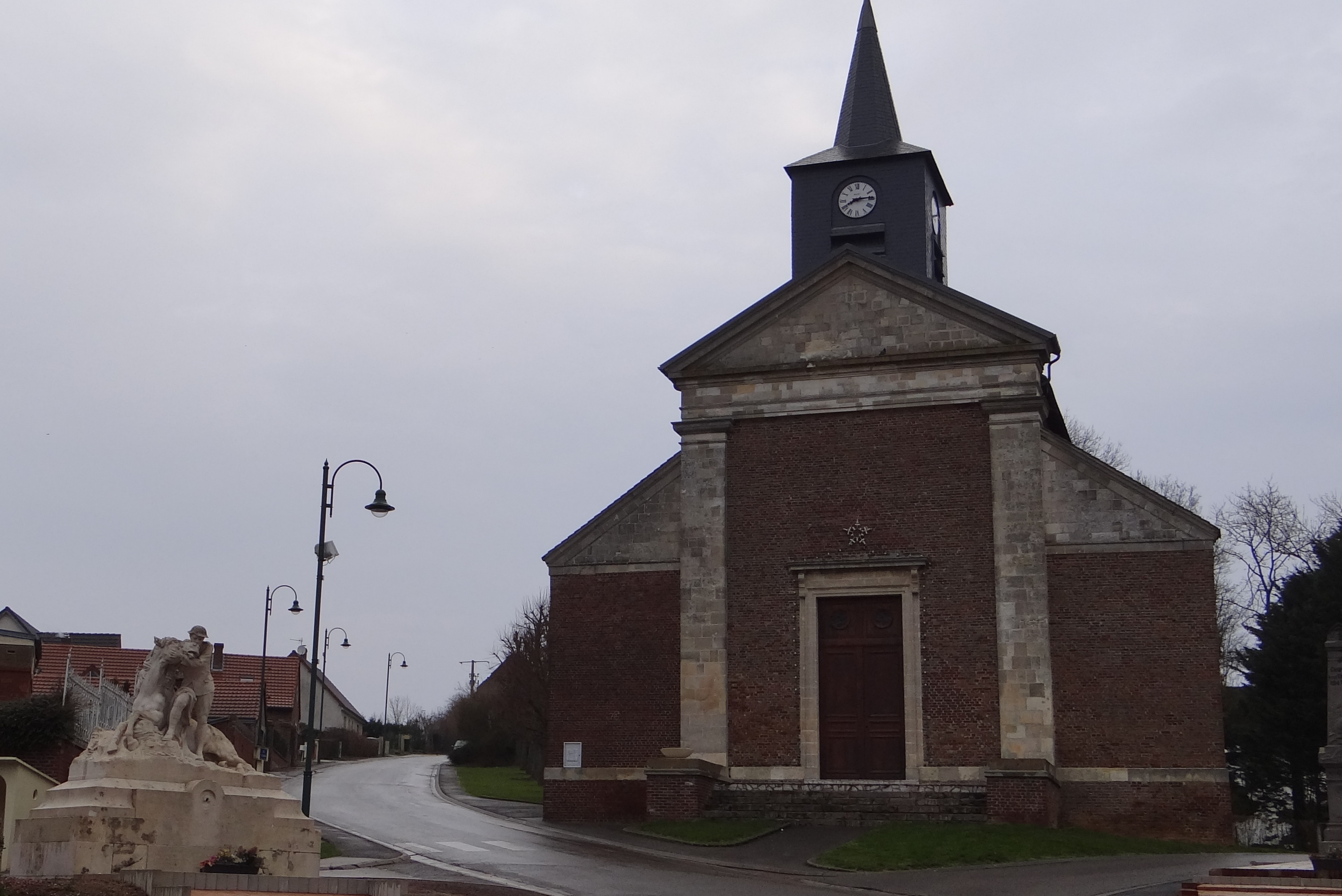
- The church in Chipilly
- Location of Chipilly
- Location within France Location within Hauts-de-France
- Coordinates: 49°54′34″N 2°39′02″E
- Country: France
- Region: Hauts-de-France
- Department: Somme
- Arrondissement: Amiens
- Canton: Corbie
- Intercommunality: Val de Somme

Government
  - Mayor (2020–2026): Jean-Luc Delétré
- Area^{1}: 6.85 km^{2} (2.64 sq mi)
- Elevation: 80 m (260 ft)
- Highest elevation: 105 m (344 ft)
- Lowest elevation: 32 m (105 ft)
- Population (2023): 172
  - Density: 25.1/km^{2} (65.0/sq mi)
- Time zone: UTC+01:00 (CET)
  - Summer (DST): UTC+02:00 (CEST)
- INSEE/Postal code: 80192 /80800
- ^{1} French Land Register data, which excludes lakes, ponds, glaciers > 1 km^{2} (0.386 sq mi or 247 acres) and river estuaries.

Chipilly (Picard: Chipillin) is a commune in the Somme department in Hauts-de-France in northern France.

== Geography ==
Chipilly is situated on the D71 road, on the opposite bank of the river Somme from Cerisy, to the east of Amiens and 7 miles (11 km) from Albert.

== Population ==
Historical population
Year	Pop.	±% p.a.
1968	125	—
1975	120	−0.58%
1982	110	−1.24%
1990	118	+0.88%
1999	135	+1.51%
2007	179	+3.59%
2012	185	+0.66%
2017	171	−1.56%
2023	172	+0.10%
Source: INSEE

== See also ==
- Communes of the Somme department
