= Canton of Corbie =

Coordinates: 49°54′35″N 2°30′29″E

Corbie
- Canton
- Interactive map of Corbie
- Country: France
- Region: Hauts-de-France
- Department: Somme
- No. of communes: {{{nbcomm}}}
- Area: 297.19 km^{2} (114.75 sq mi)
- Population (2023): 23,772
  - Density: 79.989/km^{2} (207.17/sq mi)
- INSEE code: 80 13

The Canton of Corbie is a canton situated in the department of the Somme and in the Hauts-de-France region of northern France.

== Geography ==
The canton is organised around the commune of Corbie.

== Composition ==
At the French canton reorganisation which came into effect in March 2015, the canton was expanded from 23 to 40 communes:

- Baizieux
- Bavelincourt
- Beaucourt-sur-l'Hallue
- Béhencourt
- Bonnay
- Bresle
- Cerisy
- Chipilly
- Contay
- Corbie
- Fouilloy
- Franvillers
- Fréchencourt
- Le Hamel
- Hamelet
- Heilly
- Hénencourt
- Lahoussoye
- Lamotte-Warfusée
- Marcelcave
- Méricourt-l'Abbé
- Mirvaux
- Molliens-au-Bois
- Montigny-sur-l'Hallue
- Morcourt
- Naours
- Pierregot
- Pont-Noyelles
- Ribemont-sur-Ancre
- Rubempré
- Sailly-Laurette
- Sailly-le-Sec
- Talmas
- Treux
- Vadencourt
- Vaire-sous-Corbie
- Vaux-sur-Somme
- La Vicogne
- Wargnies
- Warloy-Baillon

== Population ==
Historical population
Year	Pop.	±% p.a.
2013	24,225	—
2018	24,369	+0.12%
Source: INSEE

== See also ==
- Arrondissements of the Somme department
- Cantons of the Somme department
- Communes of the Somme department
