= Lahoussoye =

- Commune
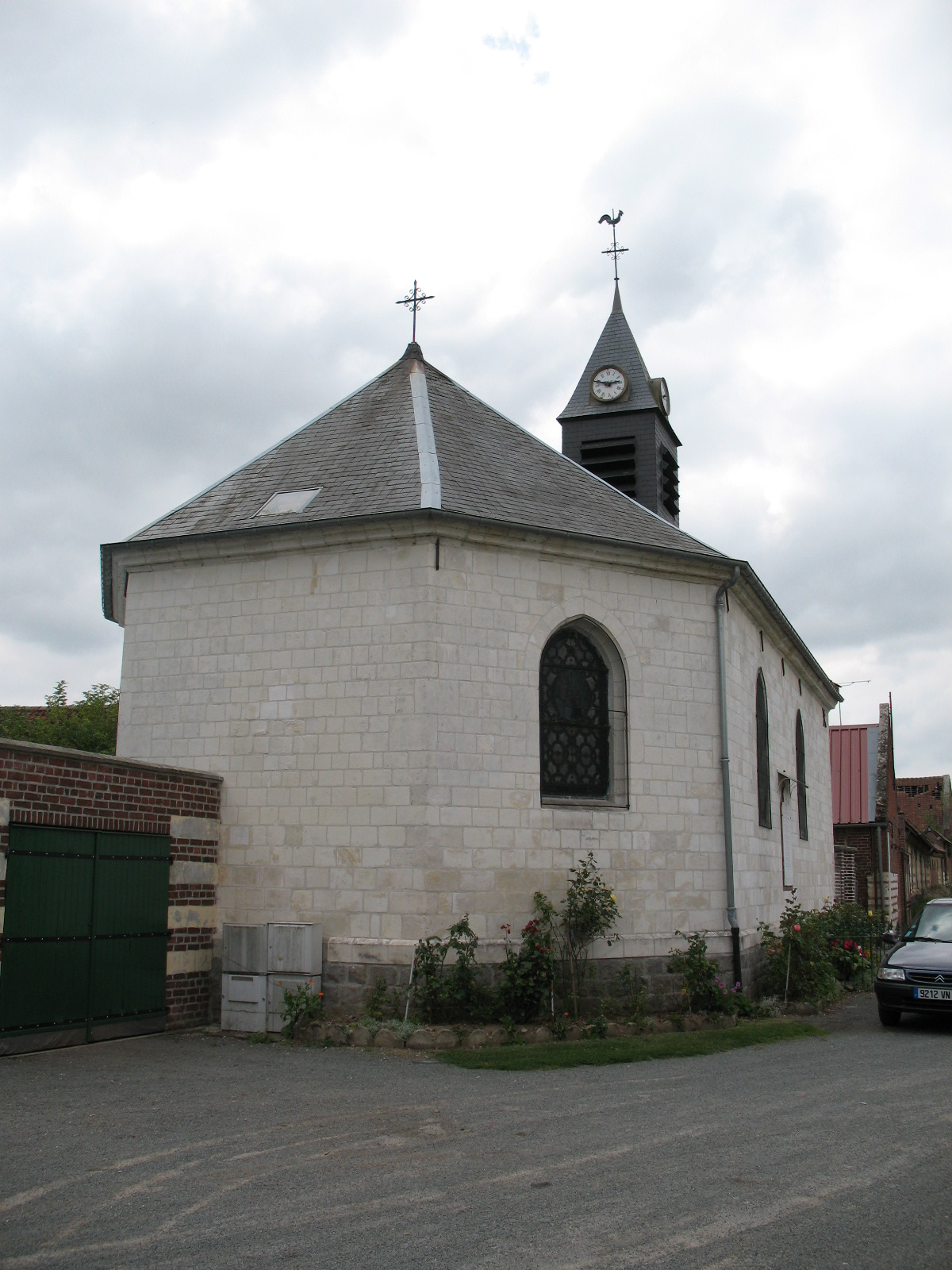
- The church in Lahoussoye

- Coat of arms
- Location of Lahoussoye
- Location within France Location within Hauts-de-France
- Coordinates: 49°57′08″N 2°28′57″E
- Country: France
- Region: Hauts-de-France
- Department: Somme
- Arrondissement: Amiens
- Canton: Corbie
- Intercommunality: Val de Somme

Government
  - Mayor (2020–2026): Brigitte Leroy
- Area^{1}: 4.09 km^{2} (1.58 sq mi)
- Elevation: 122 m (400 ft)
- Highest elevation: 127 m (417 ft)
- Lowest elevation: 55 m (180 ft)
- Population (2023): 442
  - Density: 108/km^{2} (280/sq mi)
- Time zone: UTC+01:00 (CET)
  - Summer (DST): UTC+02:00 (CEST)
- INSEE/Postal code: 80458 /80800
- ^{1} French Land Register data, which excludes lakes, ponds, glaciers > 1 km^{2} (0.386 sq mi or 247 acres) and river estuaries.

Lahoussoye is a commune in the Somme department in Hauts-de-France in northern France.

== Geography ==
Lahoussoye is situated on the D929 road, about 10 miles (16 km) northeast of Amiens.

== Population ==
Historical population
Year	Pop.	±% p.a.
1968	176	—
1975	177	+0.08%
1982	225	+3.49%
1990	300	+3.66%
1999	325	+0.89%
2007	340	+0.57%
2012	438	+5.20%
2017	471	+1.46%
2023	442	−1.05%
Source: INSEE

== See also ==
- Communes of the Somme department
