= Hamelet =

- Commune
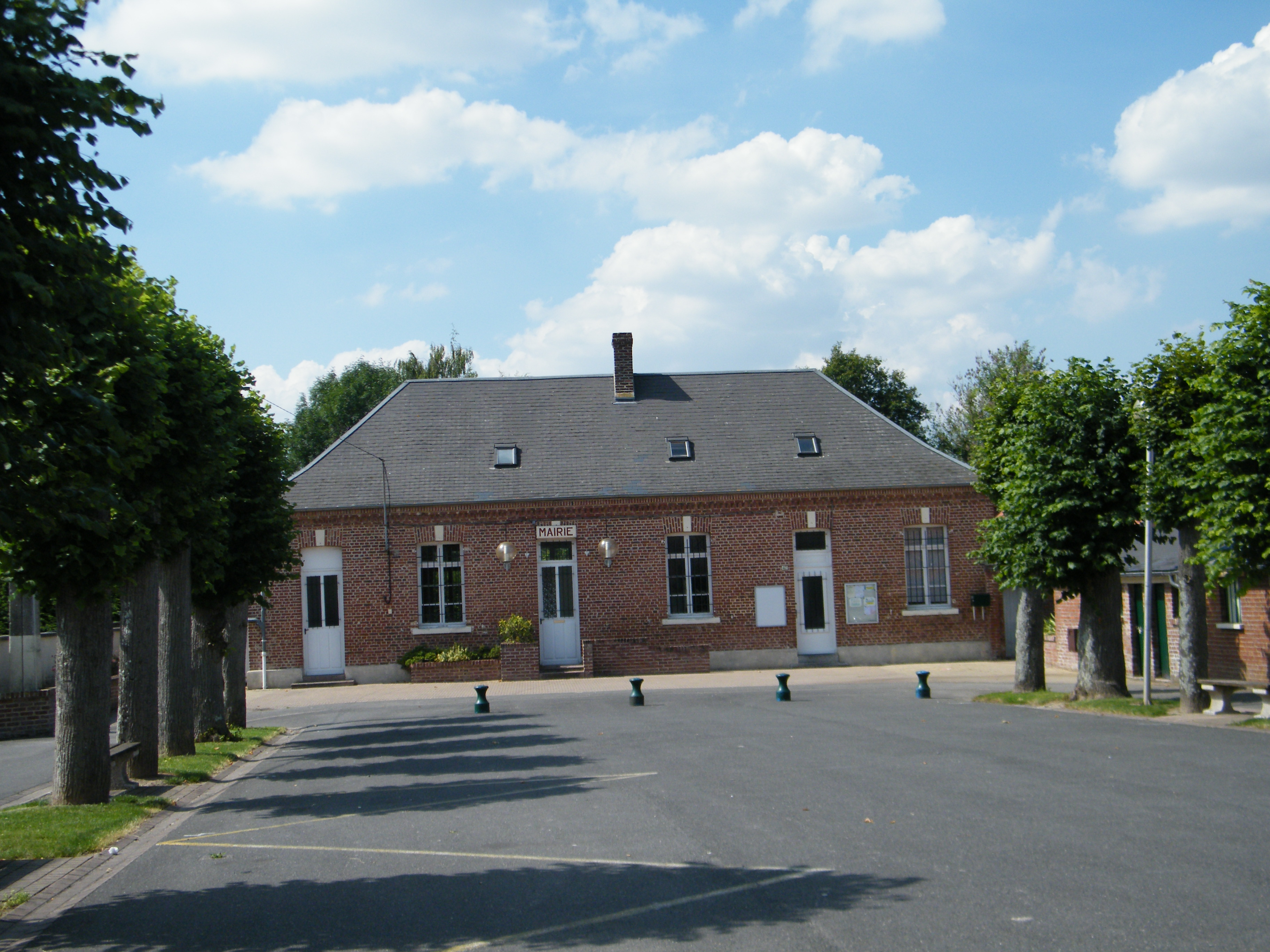
- The town hall in Hamelet

- Coat of arms
- Location of Hamelet
- Location within France Location within Hauts-de-France
- Coordinates: 49°54′22″N 2°31′46″E
- Country: France
- Region: Hauts-de-France
- Department: Somme
- Arrondissement: Amiens
- Canton: Corbie
- Intercommunality: Val de Somme

Government
  - Mayor (2020–2026): Patrick Petit
- Area^{1}: 5.93 km^{2} (2.29 sq mi)
- Elevation: 60 m (200 ft)
- Highest elevation: 107 m (351 ft)
- Lowest elevation: 28 m (92 ft)
- Population (2023): 624
  - Density: 105/km^{2} (273/sq mi)
- Time zone: UTC+01:00 (CET)
  - Summer (DST): UTC+02:00 (CEST)
- INSEE/Postal code: 80412 /80800
- ^{1} French Land Register data, which excludes lakes, ponds, glaciers > 1 km^{2} (0.386 sq mi or 247 acres) and river estuaries.

Hamelet is a commune in the Somme department in Hauts-de-France in northern France.

== Geography ==
Hamelet is situated on the D71 road, some 12 miles (19 km) east of Amiens.

== Population ==
Historical population
Year	Pop.	±% p.a.
1968	273	—
1975	268	−0.26%
1982	371	+4.76%
1990	388	+0.56%
1999	412	+0.67%
2007	462	+1.44%
2012	564	+4.07%
2017	630	+2.24%
2023	624	−0.16%
Source: INSEE

== See also ==
- Communes of the Somme department
