= Warloy-Baillon =

- Commune
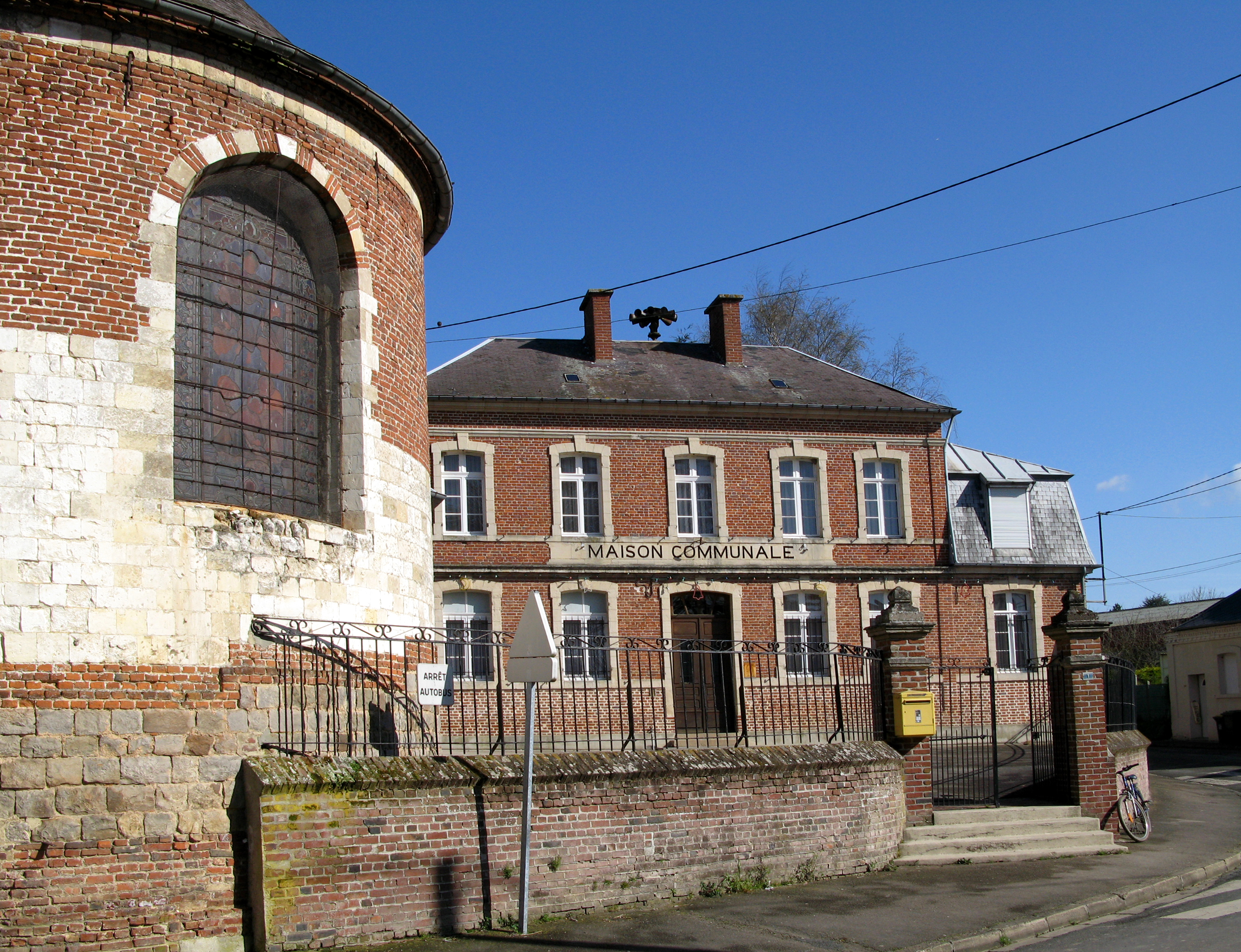
- The town hall in Warloy-Baillon
- Location of Warloy-Baillon
- Location within France Location within Hauts-de-France
- Coordinates: 50°00′38″N 2°31′28″E
- Country: France
- Region: Hauts-de-France
- Department: Somme
- Arrondissement: Amiens
- Canton: Corbie
- Intercommunality: Val de Somme

Government
  - Mayor (2020–2026): Frédéric Martin
- Area^{1}: 15.27 km^{2} (5.90 sq mi)
- Elevation: 68 m (223 ft)
- Highest elevation: 142 m (466 ft)
- Lowest elevation: 57 m (187 ft)
- Population (2023): 743
  - Density: 48.7/km^{2} (126/sq mi)
- Time zone: UTC+01:00 (CET)
  - Summer (DST): UTC+02:00 (CEST)
- INSEE/Postal code: 80820 /80300
- ^{1} French Land Register data, which excludes lakes, ponds, glaciers > 1 km^{2} (0.386 sq mi or 247 acres) and river estuaries.

Warloy-Baillon is a commune in the Somme department in Hauts-de-France in northern France.

== Geography ==
The commune is situated 15 miles (24 km) northeast of Amiens, on the D919 road

== Population ==
Historical population
Year	Pop.	±% p.a.
1968	733	—
1975	710	−0.45%
1982	698	−0.24%
1990	718	+0.35%
1999	708	−0.16%
2007	740	+0.55%
2012	824	+2.17%
2017	758	−1.66%
2023	743	−0.33%
Source: INSEE

== Places of interest ==
- The church of Saint-Pierre: The stone building was constructed on natural sandstone foundations.
- The war memorial.
- The military cemetery
- Memorial plaque to two Allied pilots that died over Warloy-Baillon during the Second World War: in 1940, Lucas in a Hurricane Mk1; and in 1944, Pinkney in an Auster.
- The tower of an old windmill, in need of restoration.

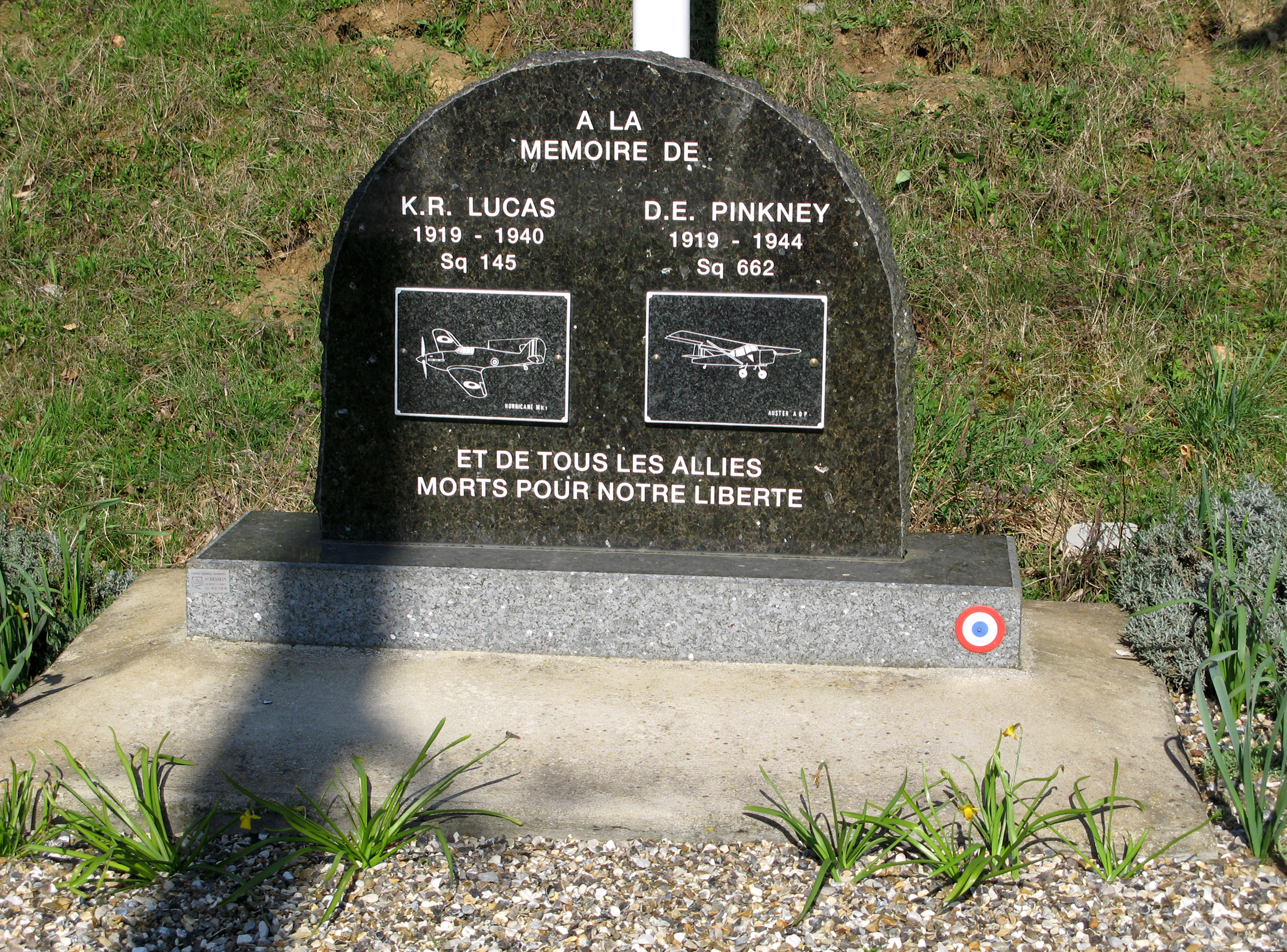
Marble memorial to two Allied pilots.

== See also ==
- Communes of the Somme department
