= Baizieux =

- Commune
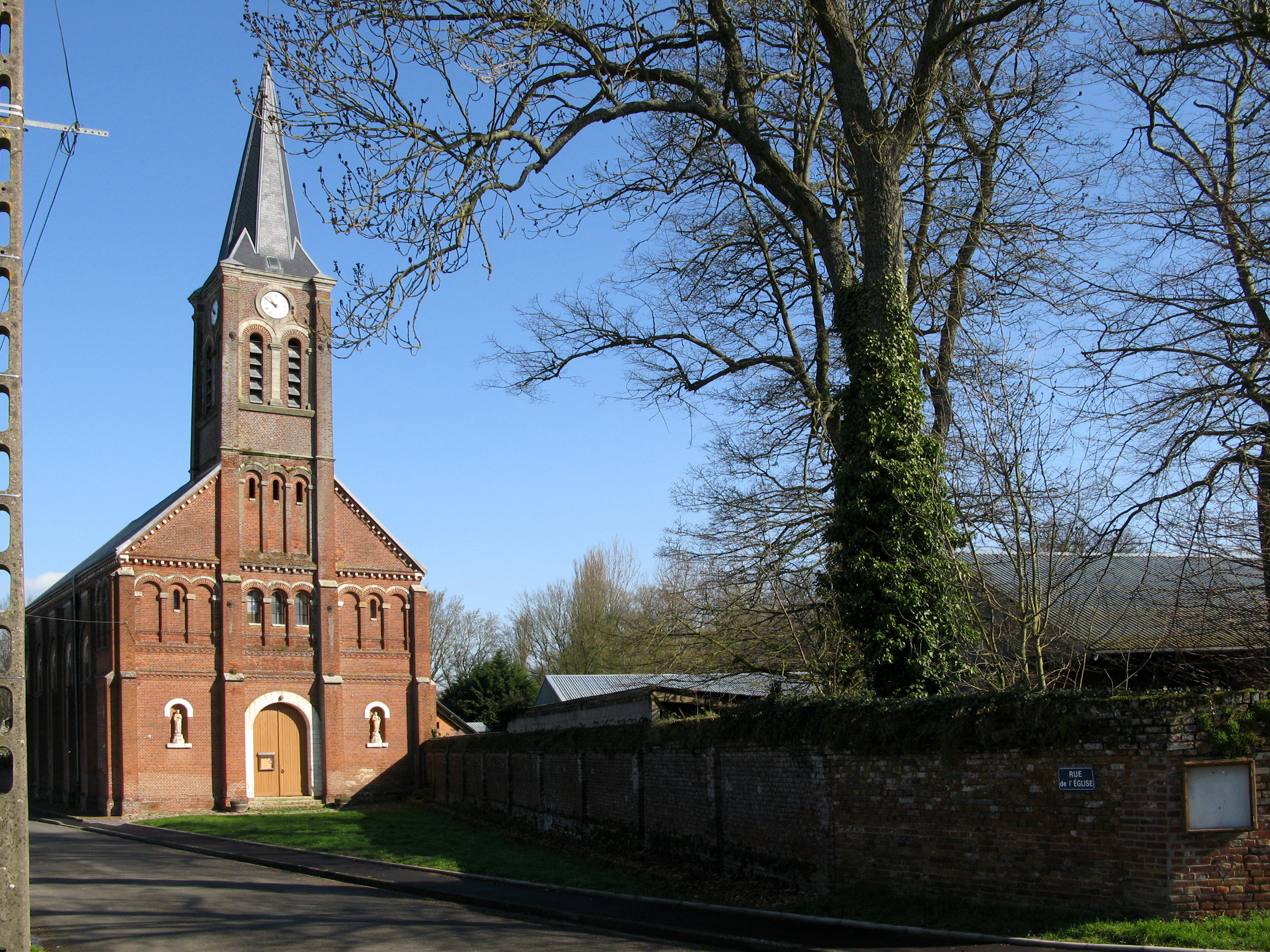
- The church of Baizieux

- Coat of arms
- Location of Baizieux
- Location within France Location within Hauts-de-France
- Coordinates: 49°59′37″N 2°31′11″E
- Country: France
- Region: Hauts-de-France
- Department: Somme
- Arrondissement: Amiens
- Canton: Corbie
- Intercommunality: CC du Val de Somme

Government
  - Mayor (2020–2026): Marie-Josée Vaquier
- Area^{1}: 5.09 km^{2} (1.97 sq mi)
- Elevation: 107 m (351 ft)
- Highest elevation: 127 m (417 ft)
- Lowest elevation: 61 m (200 ft)
- Population (2023): 243
  - Density: 47.7/km^{2} (124/sq mi)
- Time zone: UTC+01:00 (CET)
  - Summer (DST): UTC+02:00 (CEST)
- INSEE/Postal code: 80052 /80300
- ^{1} French Land Register data, which excludes lakes, ponds, glaciers > 1 km^{2} (0.386 sq mi or 247 acres) and river estuaries.

Baizieux (French pronunciation: [bɛzjø]; Picard: Boaiziu) is a commune in the Somme department in Hauts-de-France in northern France.

== Geography ==
Situated 20 miles (32 km) northeast of Amiens, on the D179 road.

== Population ==
Historical population
Year	Pop.	±% p.a.
1968	172	—
1975	172	+0.00%
1982	155	−1.48%
1990	183	+2.10%
1999	215	+1.81%
2007	227	+0.68%
2012	203	−2.21%
2017	207	+0.39%
2023	243	+2.71%
Source: INSEE

== See also ==
- Communes of the Somme department
