= Naours =

- Commune
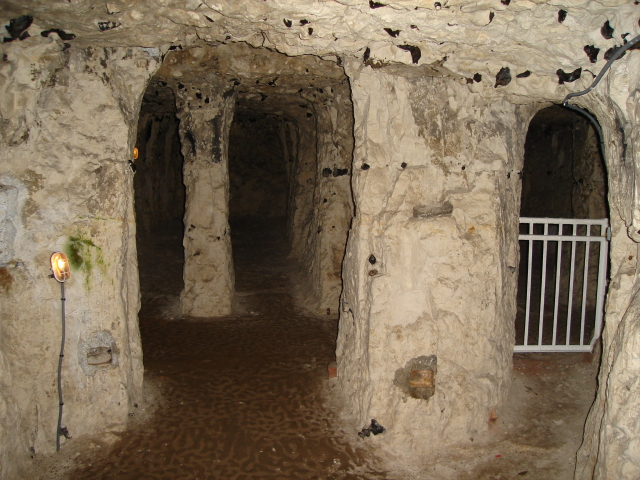
- Chapel in the underground city of Naours

- Coat of arms
- Location of Naours
- Location within France Location within Hauts-de-France
- Coordinates: 50°02′10″N 2°16′39″E
- Country: France
- Region: Hauts-de-France
- Department: Somme
- Arrondissement: Amiens
- Canton: Corbie
- Intercommunality: CC Territoire Nord Picardie

Government
  - Mayor (2020–2026): Jean-Michel Bouchy
- Area^{1}: 16.55 km^{2} (6.39 sq mi)
- Elevation: 30 m (98 ft)
- Highest elevation: 154 m (505 ft)
- Lowest elevation: 61 m (200 ft)
- Population (2023): 1,047
  - Density: 63.26/km^{2} (163.9/sq mi)
- Time zone: UTC+01:00 (CET)
  - Summer (DST): UTC+02:00 (CEST)
- INSEE/Postal code: 80584 /80260
- ^{1} French Land Register data, which excludes lakes, ponds, glaciers > 1 km^{2} (0.386 sq mi or 247 acres) and river estuaries.

Naours (French pronunciation: [nauʁ]; Picard: Nour) is a commune in the Somme department in Hauts-de-France in northern France.

== Geography ==
Naours is situated on the D117 and D60 crossroads, some 13 miles (21 km) north of Amiens.

== Population ==
Historical population
Year	Pop.	±% p.a.
1968	683	—
1975	721	+0.78%
1982	962	+4.21%
1990	1,050	+1.10%
1999	1,124	+0.76%
2007	1,141	+0.19%
2012	1,108	−0.59%
2017	1,080	−0.51%
2023	1,047	−0.52%
Source: INSEE

== See also ==
- Communes of the Somme department
