= Treux =

- Commune
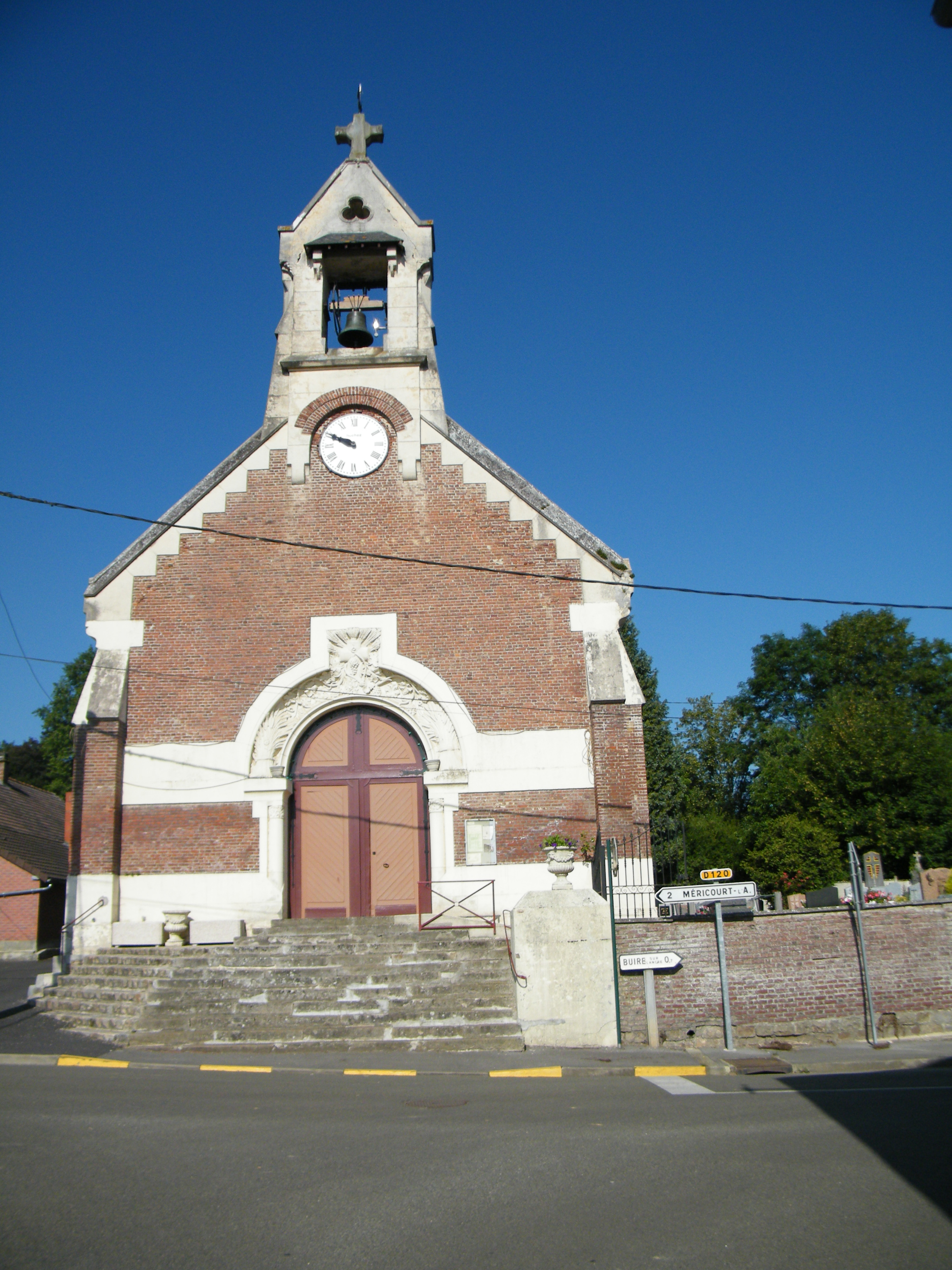
- The church in Treux
- Location of Treux
- Location within France Location within Hauts-de-France
- Coordinates: 49°57′30″N 2°35′32″E
- Country: France
- Region: Hauts-de-France
- Department: Somme
- Arrondissement: Amiens
- Canton: Corbie
- Intercommunality: Val de Somme

Government
  - Mayor (2020–2026): Philippe Boivin
- Area^{1}: 2.24 km^{2} (0.86 sq mi)
- Elevation: 40 m (130 ft)
- Highest elevation: 110 m (360 ft)
- Lowest elevation: 37 m (121 ft)
- Population (2023): 220
  - Density: 98/km^{2} (250/sq mi)
- Time zone: UTC+01:00 (CET)
  - Summer (DST): UTC+02:00 (CEST)
- INSEE/Postal code: 80769 /80300
- ^{1} French Land Register data, which excludes lakes, ponds, glaciers > 1 km^{2} (0.386 sq mi or 247 acres) and river estuaries.

Treux (French pronunciation: [tʁø]; Picard: Treu) is a commune in the Somme department in Hauts-de-France in northern France.

== Geography ==
Treux is situated 14 miles (23 km) northeast of Amiens, on the D120 road and on the banks of the Ancre.

== Population ==
Historical population
Year	Pop.	±% p.a.
1968	128	—
1975	185	+5.40%
1982	245	+4.09%
1990	267	+1.08%
1999	244	−1.00%
2007	257	+0.65%
2012	234	−1.86%
2017	249	+1.25%
2023	220	−2.04%
Source: INSEE

== See also ==
- Communes of the Somme department
