= Cerisy =

- Commune
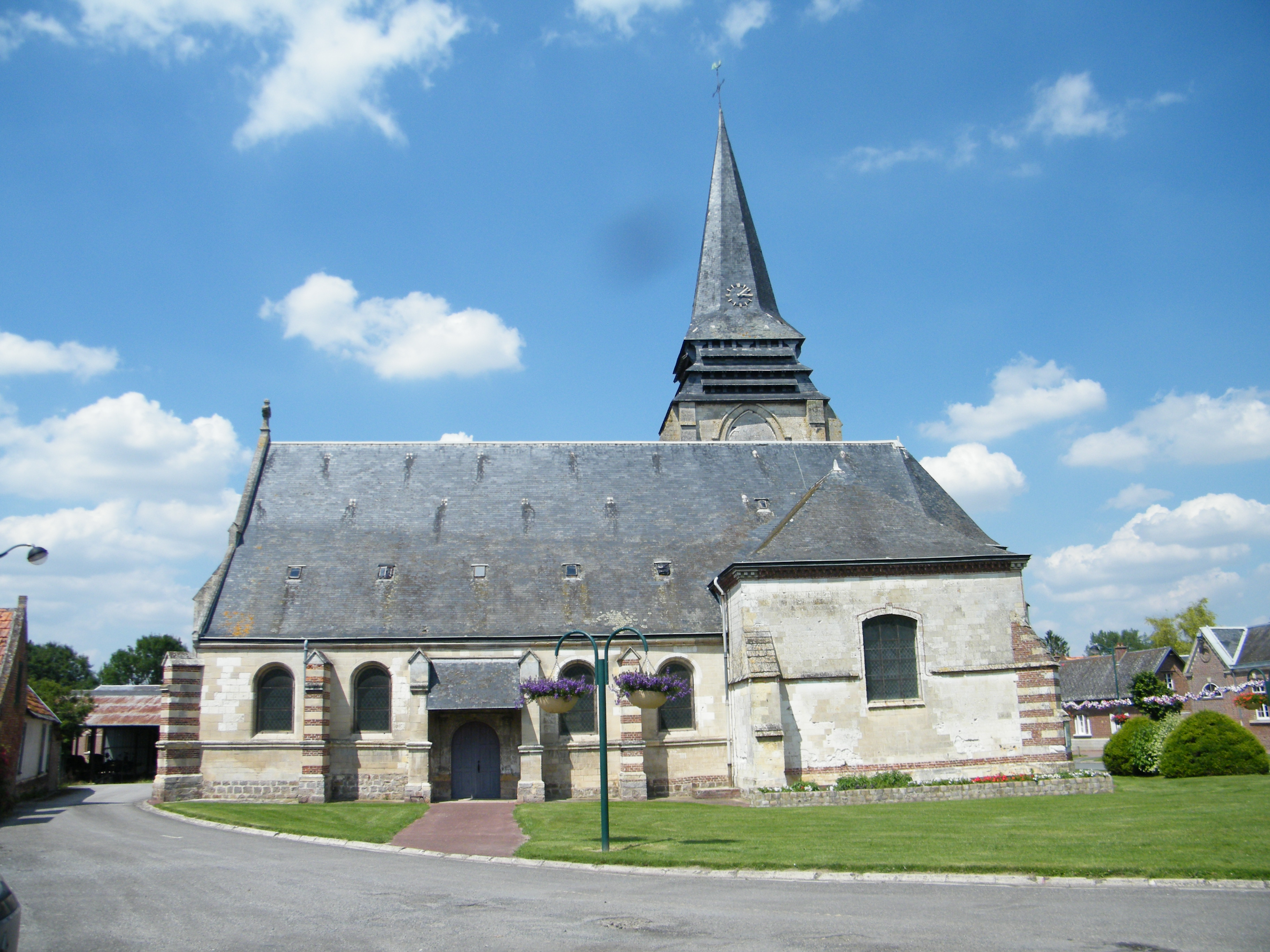
- Saint-Georges de Cerisy Church

- Coat of arms
- Location of Cerisy
- Location within France Location within Hauts-de-France
- Coordinates: 49°54′24″N 2°38′22″E
- Country: France
- Region: Hauts-de-France
- Department: Somme
- Arrondissement: Amiens
- Canton: Corbie
- Intercommunality: Val de Somme

Government
  - Mayor (2020–2026): Claudie Duthoit
- Area^{1}: 10.93 km^{2} (4.22 sq mi)
- Elevation: 68 m (223 ft)
- Highest elevation: 92 m (302 ft)
- Lowest elevation: 32 m (105 ft)
- Population (2023): 526
  - Density: 48.1/km^{2} (125/sq mi)
- Time zone: UTC+01:00 (CET)
  - Summer (DST): UTC+02:00 (CEST)
- INSEE/Postal code: 80184 /80800
- ^{1} French Land Register data, which excludes lakes, ponds, glaciers > 1 km^{2} (0.386 sq mi or 247 acres) and river estuaries.

Cerisy (French pronunciation: [səʁizi]; Picard: Çrisin) is a commune in the Somme department in Hauts-de-France in northern France.

== Geography ==
Cerisy is a small village in the district known as the Santerre, to the east of Amiens and 12 km from Albert.

Cerisy is located along the valley of the Somme. A small part of the village is built on the hillside. The houses were originally grouped around the church and the town hall but recent constructions of individual houses spread out along the main axes of the town.

== Economy ==
The soil of the commune is predominantly clay-siliceous. To the south, there are some very calcareous soils covered with a thin layer of topsoil. Towards Bayonvillers and Lamotte-Warfusée are flint beds. To the north and north-east, the soil is marshy and peaty to the Somme. The plateaux to the south are separated by dry valleys, the most important being the valley of Boisreau.

Economic activities are mainly related to agriculture. On the municipal territory are located an industrial company and a carpentry. There is no more trade in the commune except the passage of street traders such as a bakery and butchery.

The services are represented by a nursing office and the communal school with canteen.

The commune suffers from a relative enclavement, it is connected to the other villages only by secondary roads. A cycle path is being built along the Somme canal and a path for fishermen.

== Population ==
Historical population

Year	Pop.	±% p.a.
1793	576	—
1821	622	+0.27%
1846	748	+0.74%
1872	715	−0.17%
1901	567	−0.80%
1926	538	−0.21%
1946	441	−0.99%
1954	454	+0.36%
1962	401	−1.54%

Year	Pop.	±% p.a.
1968	358	−1.87%
1975	337	−0.86%
1982	337	+0.00%
1990	342	+0.18%
1999	387	+1.38%
2007	435	+1.47%
2012	496	+2.66%
2017	531	+1.37%
2023	526	−0.16%

Source: EHESS and INSEE (1968–2023)

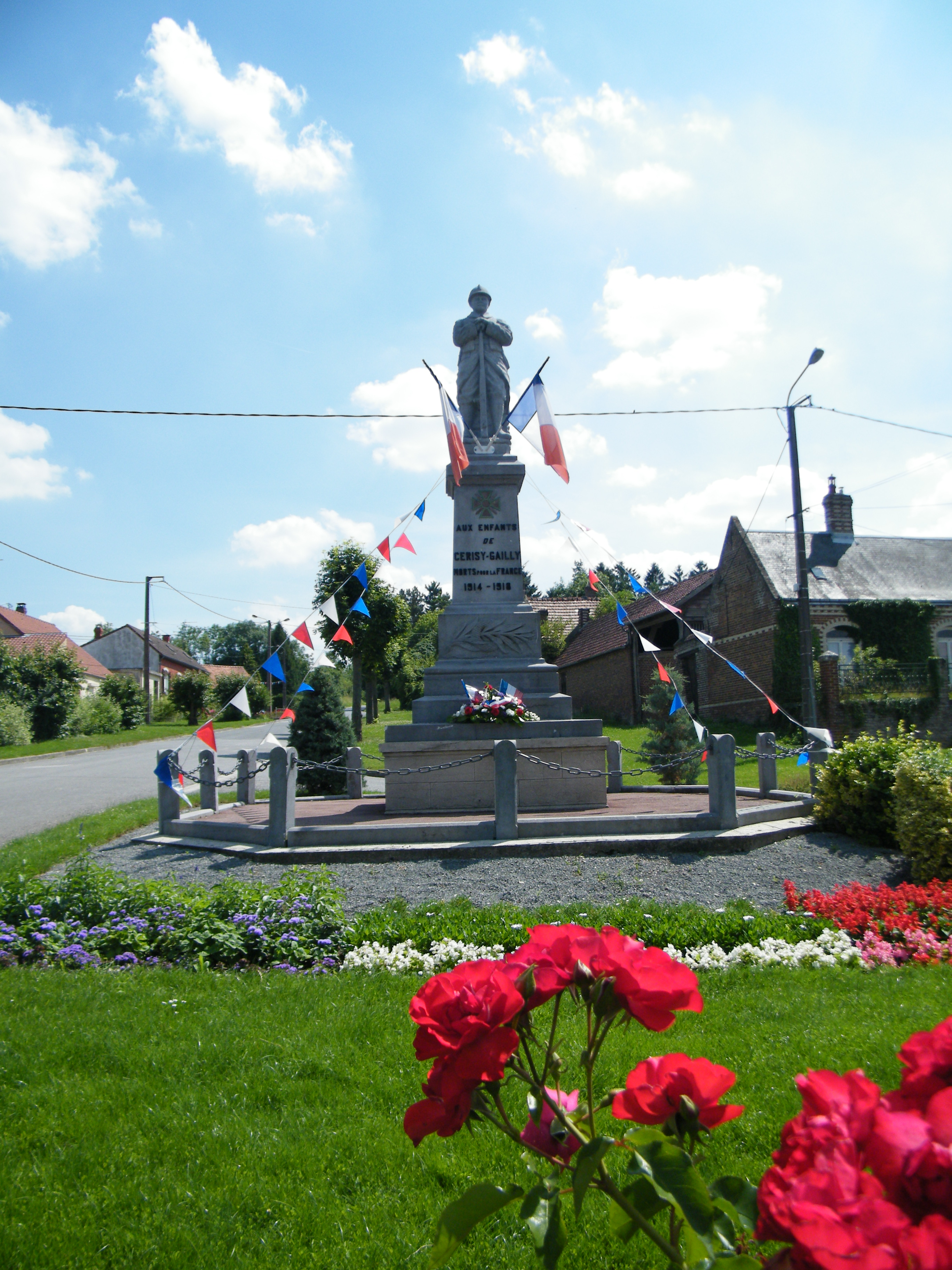
Cerisy

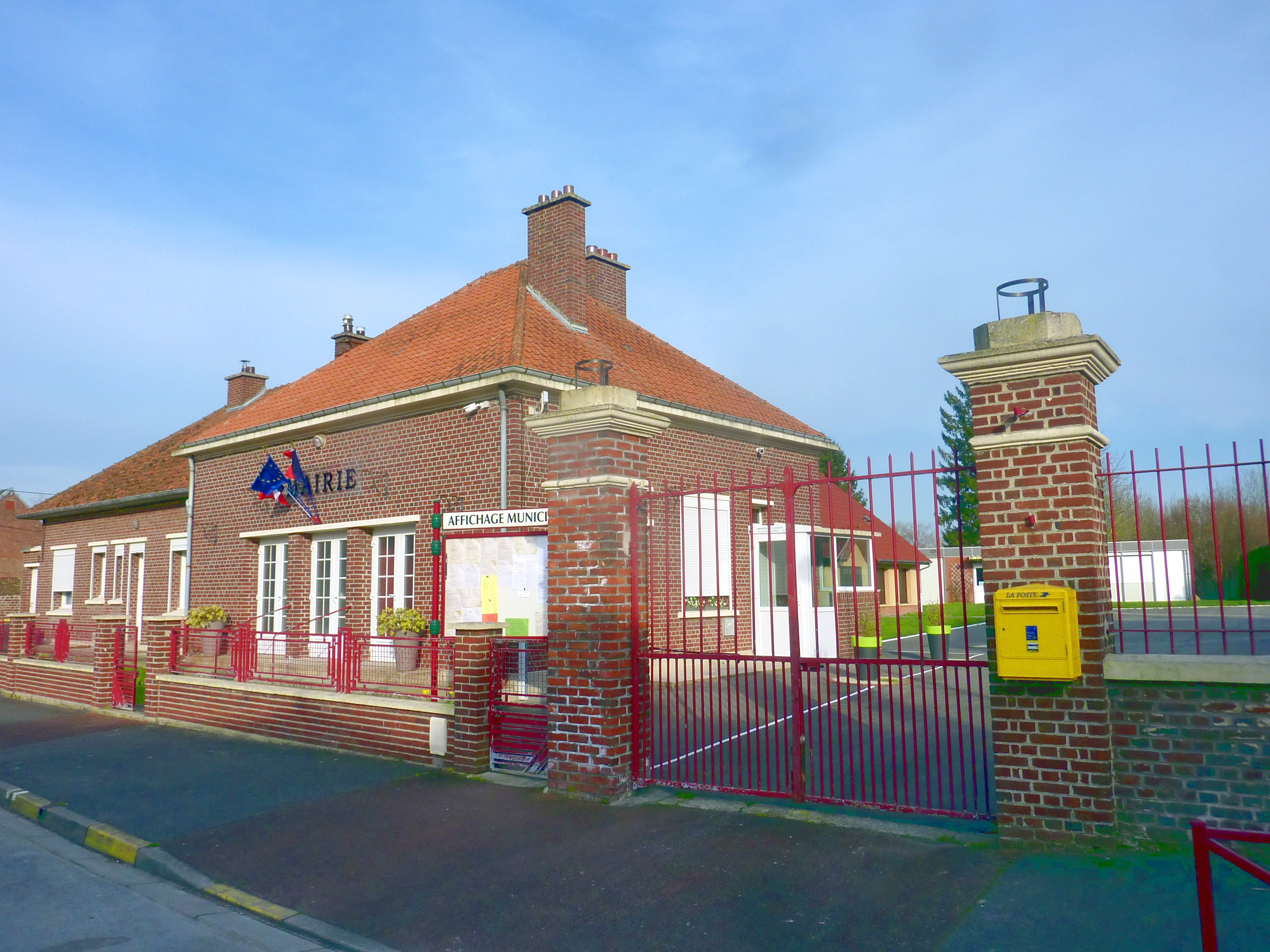
The town hall of Cerisy

== History ==
Cerisy-Gailly became Cerisy is a commune whose origin is very ancient. The village existed before the founding of the abbey of Corbie in the 7th century. It was one of the first donations made to the abbey which had installed a priory and a provost to control the exploitation of the land.

The seignior of Cerisy was from the castle of Bray-sur-Somme. A communal charter was granted to Cerisy in 1159 and the parish was created in 1220. In the 15th century, Cerisy was ravaged by the Burgundians as a stone engraved in the portal of the church indicates.

On 4 August 1636 the Spaniards crossed the Somme at Cerisy, unable to do so at Bray. In 1693, a school was founded in Cerisy. At the Revolution, the priory was suppressed and from 1870–1871 the population had to undergo the requisitions of the Prussian army. From 1914 to 1918, the village saw a large number of troops gathering on the way to the marching up down the front line.

On 1 January 1966 the town then known as Gailly became a hamlet of Sailly-Laurette of which it is separated only by the Somme and Gailly took the name of Cerisy.

By a prefectoral order of 27 December 2016, the commune was detached on 1 January 2017 from the arrondissement of Péronne to integrate the arrondissement of Amiens.

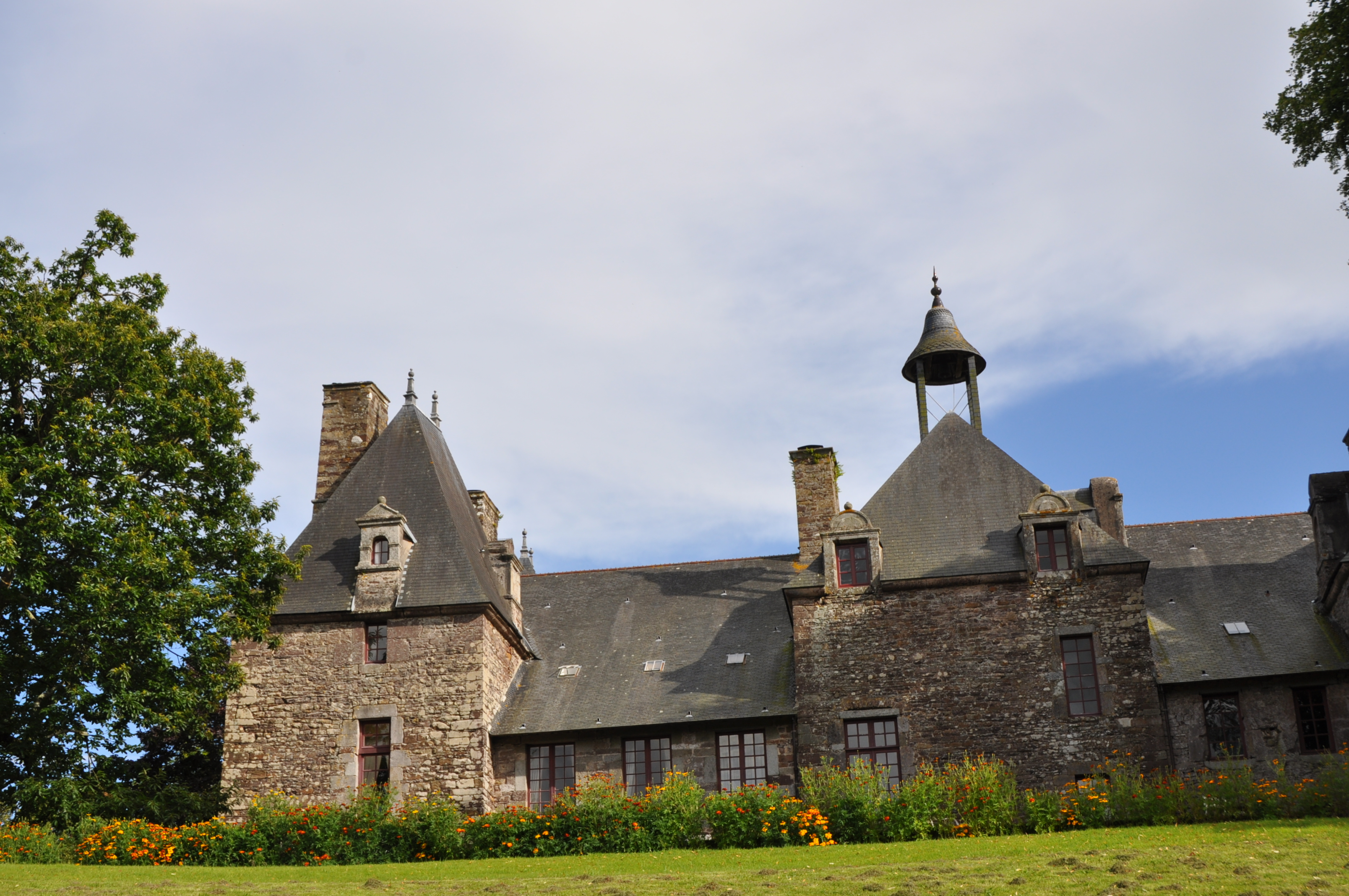
Cerisy château

The mayor is Claudie Duthoit, re-elected in 2020.

== Notable people ==
- François-Athanase Delaporte, born in 1792 in Cerisy, died in 1848 in Cerisy. He was in the Imperial Guard in 1813, seriously wounded on the battlefield during the campaign of France in 1814. Chevalier of the Legion of Honor on 27 February 1814. He became a farmer on his return.
- Louis-Wulphy Boulanger, born in 1777 in Rue, died in 1863 in Cerisy. He was a Captain of cavalry under the First Empire and the Restoration, Knight of the Legion of Honor in 1847, 16 campaigns of war. He was married in 1824 in Cerisy with Marie-Anne-Bertine Coursaut.
- Walter (Abbot of Evesham), 10th century monk, and Abbot of Evesham who fought for Church rights against unfair acquisitions of church estates by Odo of Bayeux, and Urse d'Abitôt, following the Norman Conquest.

== Saint-Georges de Cerisy Church ==
Saint Georges’ church dates from the thirteenth century.

The L'église Saint-Georges de Cerisy church is at the center of the village de Cerisy. The building of the church dates from the 13th century for the bell tower and the nave and from the 16th century for the rest of the building. The church was partially destroyed during the First World War and restored during the interwar period. It is protected under historical monuments classification by order of 5 August 1919.

The church built in stone is Gothic style. The two lateral portals are Renaissance style, the north portal dates from 1576, the south portal from 1566, it is decorated with a sculpture representing the Descent from the Cross with Joseph of Arimathea supporting Jesus in the middle of the Virgin and the Women Saints. The bell tower has a portal remade in the 18th century, and a carillon that regularly sounds religious tunes such as the Ave Maria or popular tunes.

After the Great War, there was found in the ruins of the church, the ruins of a baptismal vessel made of sculpted stone of the 13th century which was restored. The baptismal font consists of a basin carved in a capital that rests on a short column.

== See also ==
- Communes of the Somme department
- Réseau des Bains de Mer
