= Morcourt, Somme =

Morcourt
- Commune
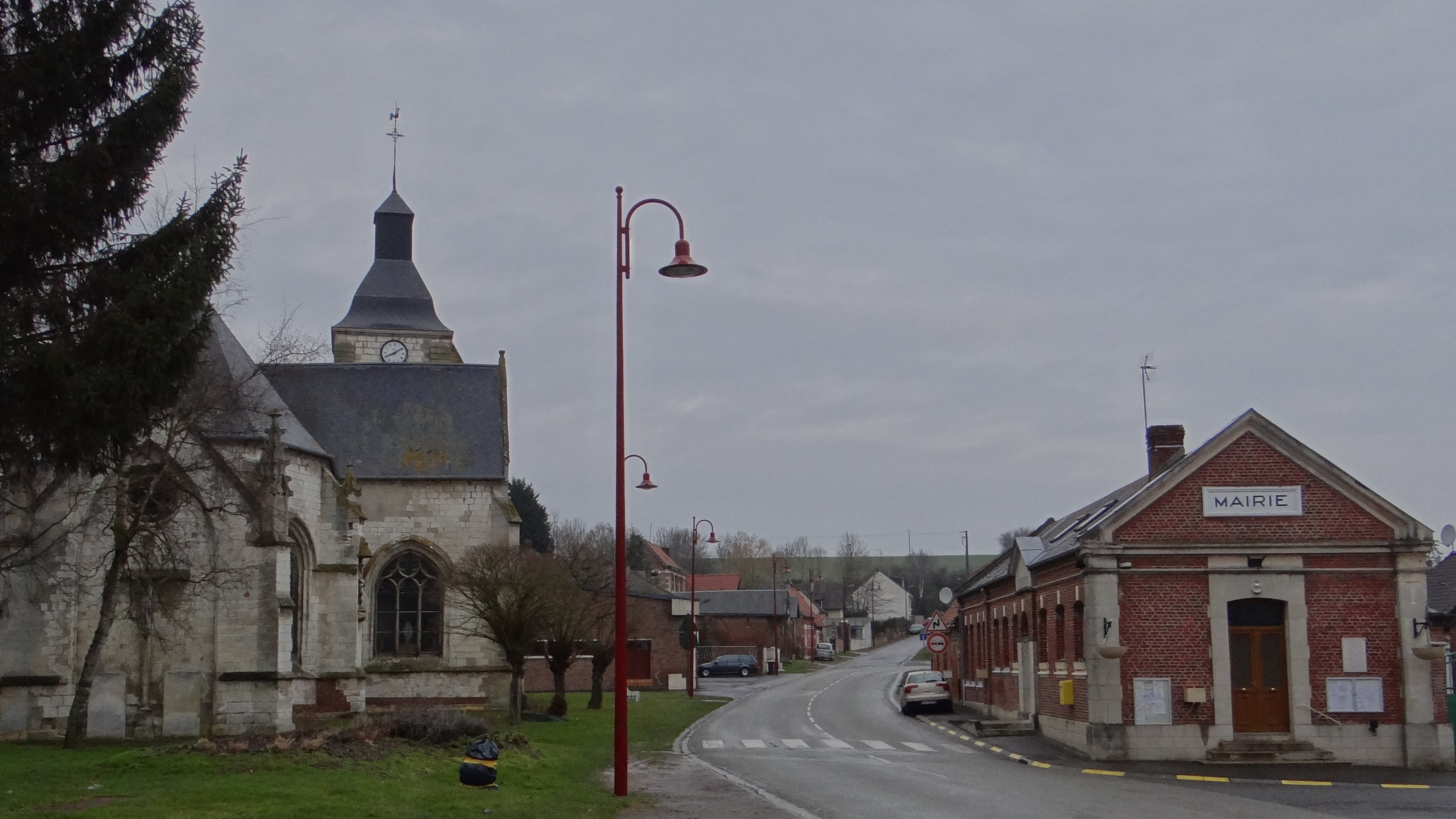
- The church and town hall in Morcourt
- Location of Morcourt
- Location within France Location within Hauts-de-France
- Coordinates: 49°53′34″N 2°39′08″E
- Country: France
- Region: Hauts-de-France
- Department: Somme
- Arrondissement: Amiens
- Canton: Corbie
- Intercommunality: Val de Somme

Government
  - Mayor (2020–2026): Didier Demaison
- Area^{1}: 7.56 km^{2} (2.92 sq mi)
- Elevation: 42 m (138 ft)
- Highest elevation: 93 m (305 ft)
- Lowest elevation: 31 m (102 ft)
- Population (2023): 327
  - Density: 43.3/km^{2} (112/sq mi)
- Time zone: UTC+01:00 (CET)
  - Summer (DST): UTC+02:00 (CEST)
- INSEE/Postal code: 80569 /80340
- ^{1} French Land Register data, which excludes lakes, ponds, glaciers > 1 km^{2} (0.386 sq mi or 247 acres) and river estuaries.

Morcourt (French pronunciation: [mɔʁkuʁ]) is a commune in the Somme department in Hauts-de-France in northern France.

== Geography ==
Morcourt is situated on the D71 road, some 14 miles (23 km) east of Amiens on the banks of the Somme.

== Population ==
Historical population
Year	Pop.	±% p.a.
1968	196	—
1975	183	−0.98%
1982	201	+1.35%
1990	239	+2.19%
1999	268	+1.28%
2007	274	+0.28%
2012	281	+0.51%
2017	312	+2.12%
2023	327	+0.79%
Source: INSEE

== See also ==
- Communes of the Somme department
