= Corbie =

- Commune
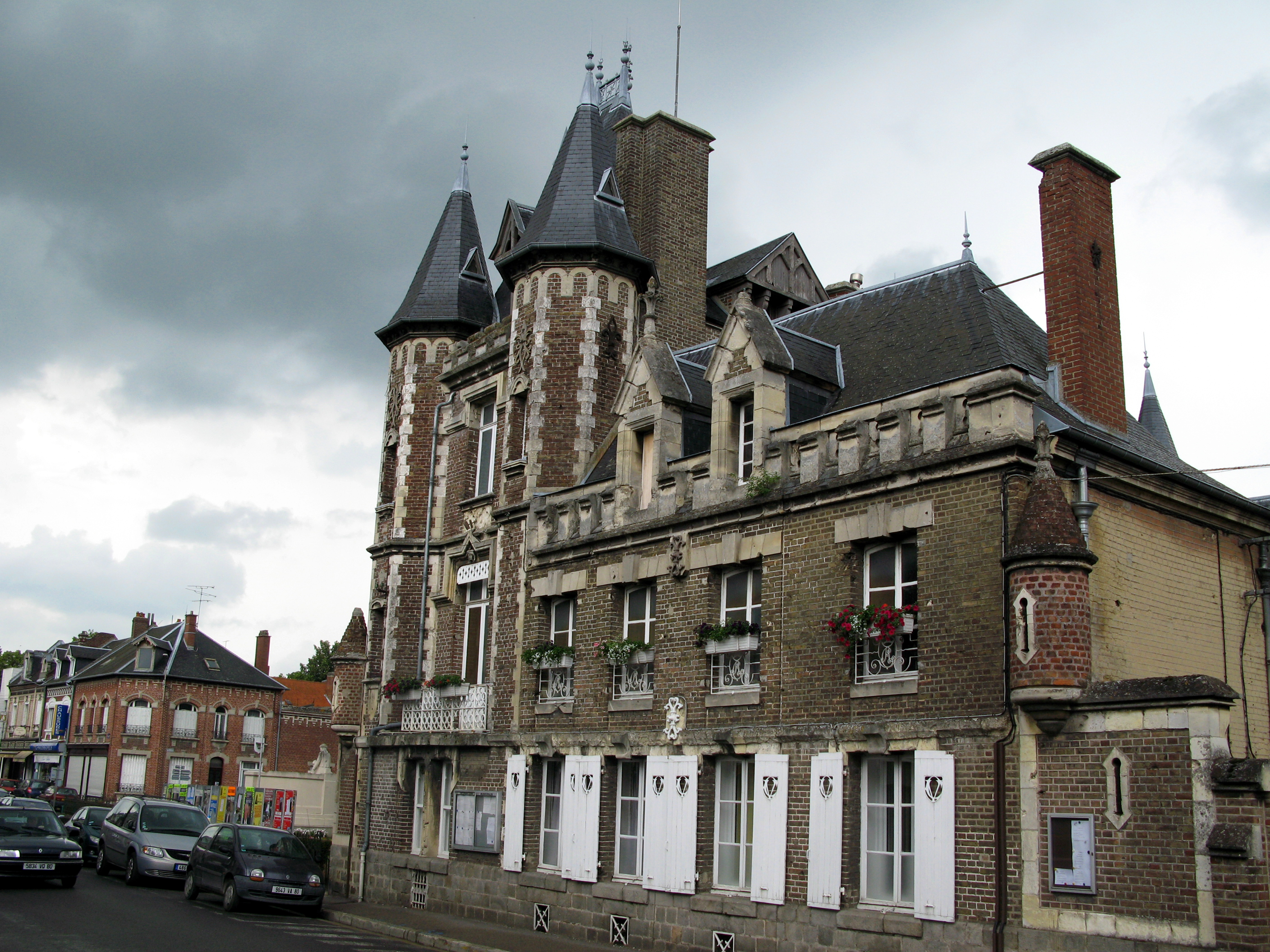
- Town hall

- Coat of arms
- Location of Corbie
- Location within France Location within Hauts-de-France
- Coordinates: 49°54′35″N 2°30′29″E
- Country: France
- Region: Hauts-de-France
- Department: Somme
- Arrondissement: Amiens
- Canton: Corbie
- Intercommunality: Val de Somme

Government
  - Mayor (2020–2026): Ludovic Gabrel
- Area^{1}: 16.25 km^{2} (6.27 sq mi)
- Elevation: 67 m (220 ft)
- Highest elevation: 108 m (354 ft)
- Lowest elevation: 26 m (85 ft)
- Population (2023): 5,982
  - Density: 368.1/km^{2} (953.4/sq mi)
- Time zone: UTC+01:00 (CET)
  - Summer (DST): UTC+02:00 (CEST)
- INSEE/Postal code: 80212 /80800
- ^{1} French Land Register data, which excludes lakes, ponds, glaciers > 1 km^{2} (0.386 sq mi or 247 acres) and river estuaries.

Corbie (French pronunciation: [kɔʁbi]; Dutch: Korbei; Picard: Corbin) is a commune of the Somme department in Hauts-de-France in northern France.

== Geography ==
The small town is situated 15 km (9.3 mi) up river from Amiens, in the département of Somme and is the main town of the canton of Corbie. It lies in the valley of the river Somme, at the confluence with the Ancre. The town is bisected by the Canal de la Somme.

This satellite photograph shows it in its context. The town is to the left and the fenny Somme valley winds down to it from the right. The chalk of the Upper Cretaceous plateau shows pale in the fields. The river Ancre flows down from the north-east. The A29 road is shown under construction snaking across the chalk in the southern part of the picture. The fainter, straight line just to its north is the road N29. It passes through Villers-Bretonneux, the village just south of Corbie.

== History ==
=== Corbie Abbey ===
The town of Corbie grew up round Corbie Abbey, founded in 657 or 660 by the queen regent Bathilde, with a founding community of monks from Luxeuil Abbey in the Franche-Comté.

Its scriptorium came to be one of the centers of work of manuscript illumination when the art was still fairly new in western Europe. In this early Merovingian period the work of Corbie was innovative in that it portrayed images of people, such as Saint Jerome. It was also the place of creation, in about 780, of the influential Caroline minuscule script.

The contents of its library are known from catalogues of the eleventh and twelfth centuries. In 1638, Cardinal Richelieu ordered the transfer of the library's books to the library at Saint-Germain-des-Prés, which was dispersed at the end of the eighteenth century.

=== Town ===
In 1234, Floris IV, Count of Holland died at a tournament held here. In 1475, the town was taken by Louis XI. The Spanish took it after a short siege on 15 August 1636 but were ousted in November by Cardinal Richelieu and Louis XIII after a siege of three months.

In 1918, Corbie was on the margin of the battlefield of Villers-Bretonneux at which the First Battle of the Somme (1918) of the German spring offensive came to a climax.

== Population ==
Historical population
Year	Pop.	±% p.a.
1968	5,261	—
1975	5,466	+0.55%
1982	6,176	+1.76%
1990	6,152	−0.05%
1999	6,317	+0.29%
2007	6,342	+0.05%
2012	6,290	−0.16%
2017	6,283	−0.02%
2023	5,982	−0.81%
Source: INSEE

== Pictures ==
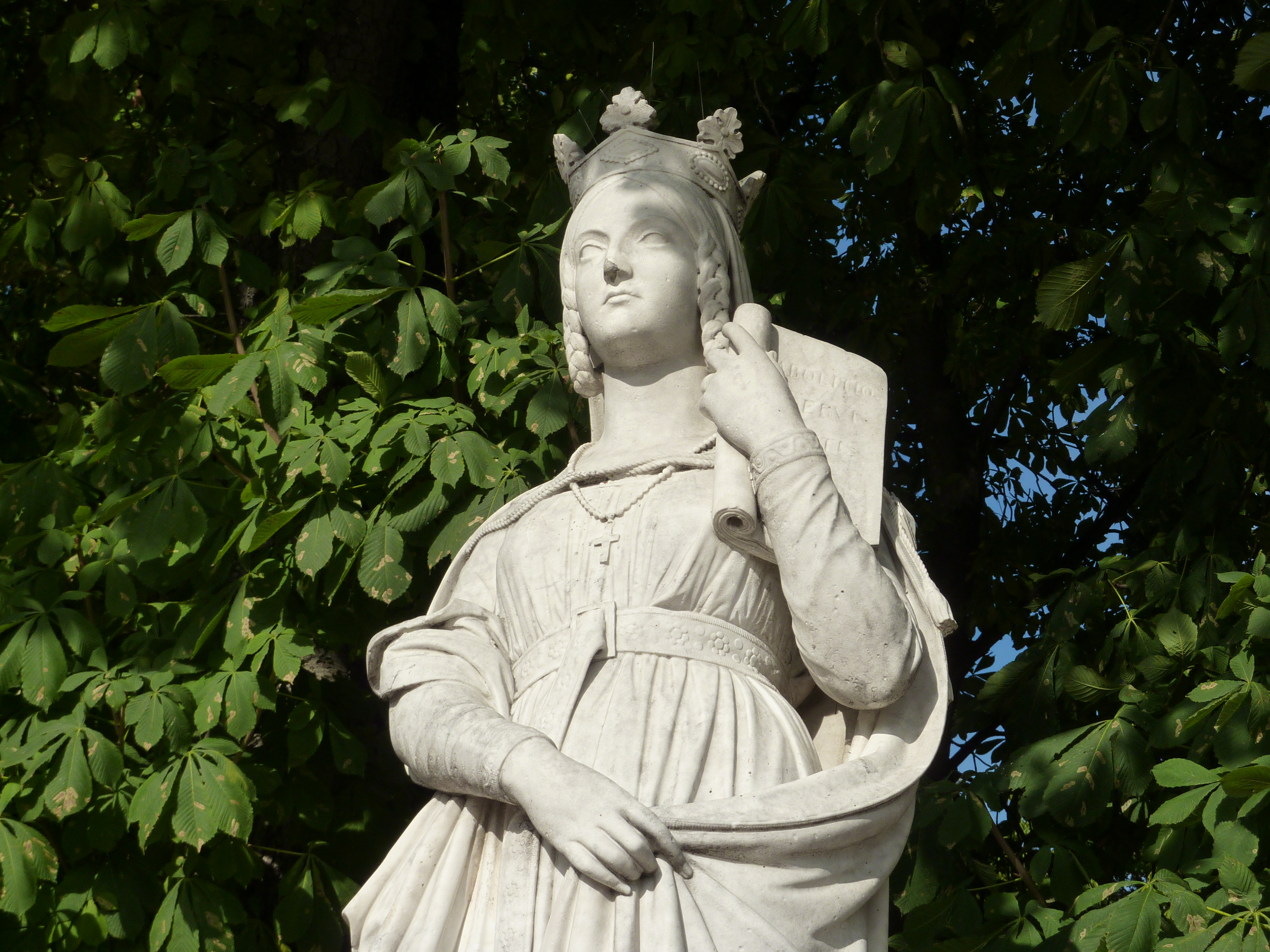
Queen Bathilde, Jardin du LUXEMBOURG, PARIS

Coat of arms of the Royal Abbey of CORBIE

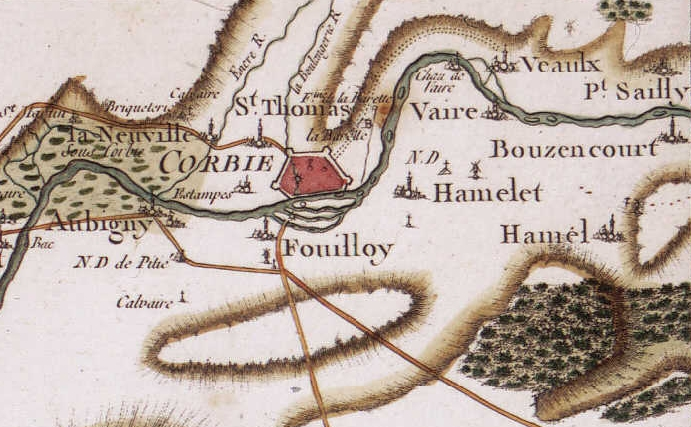
Map by CASSINI, circa 1780

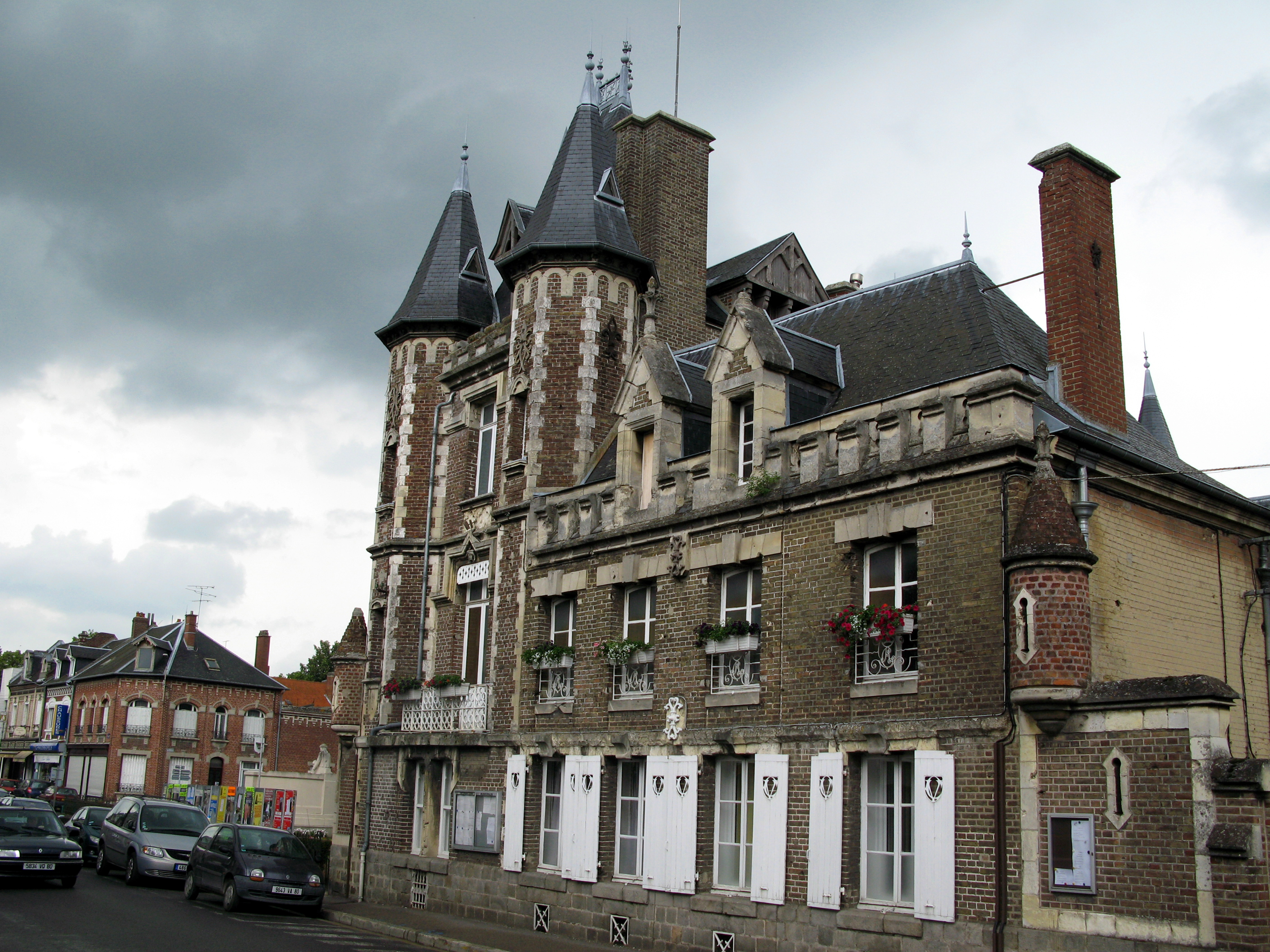
Town hall

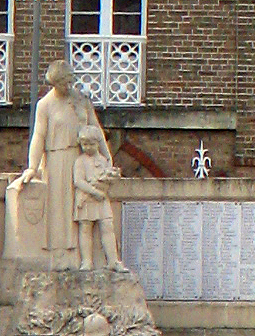
Monument by Albert Roze

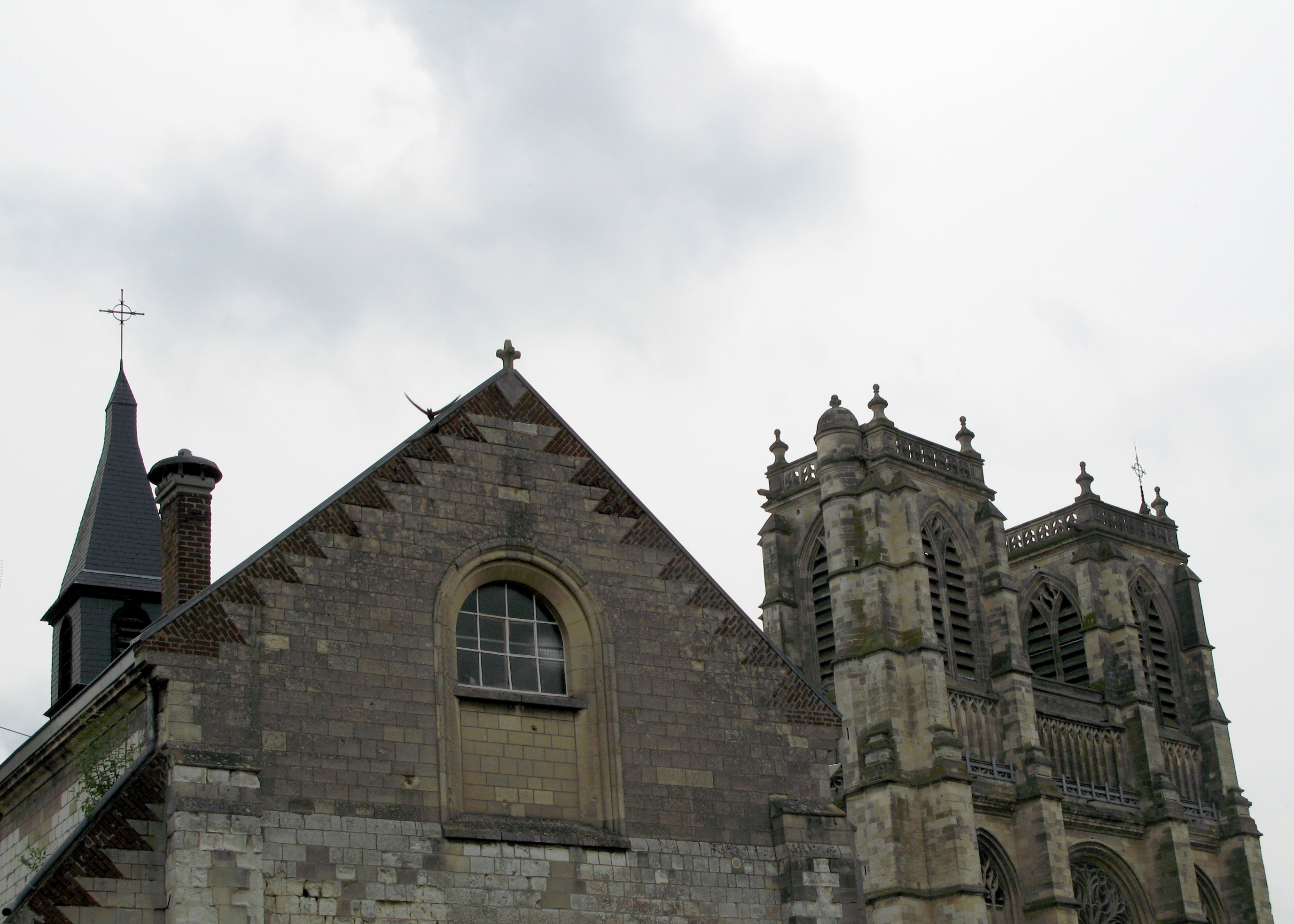
The Abbey church, 18th century

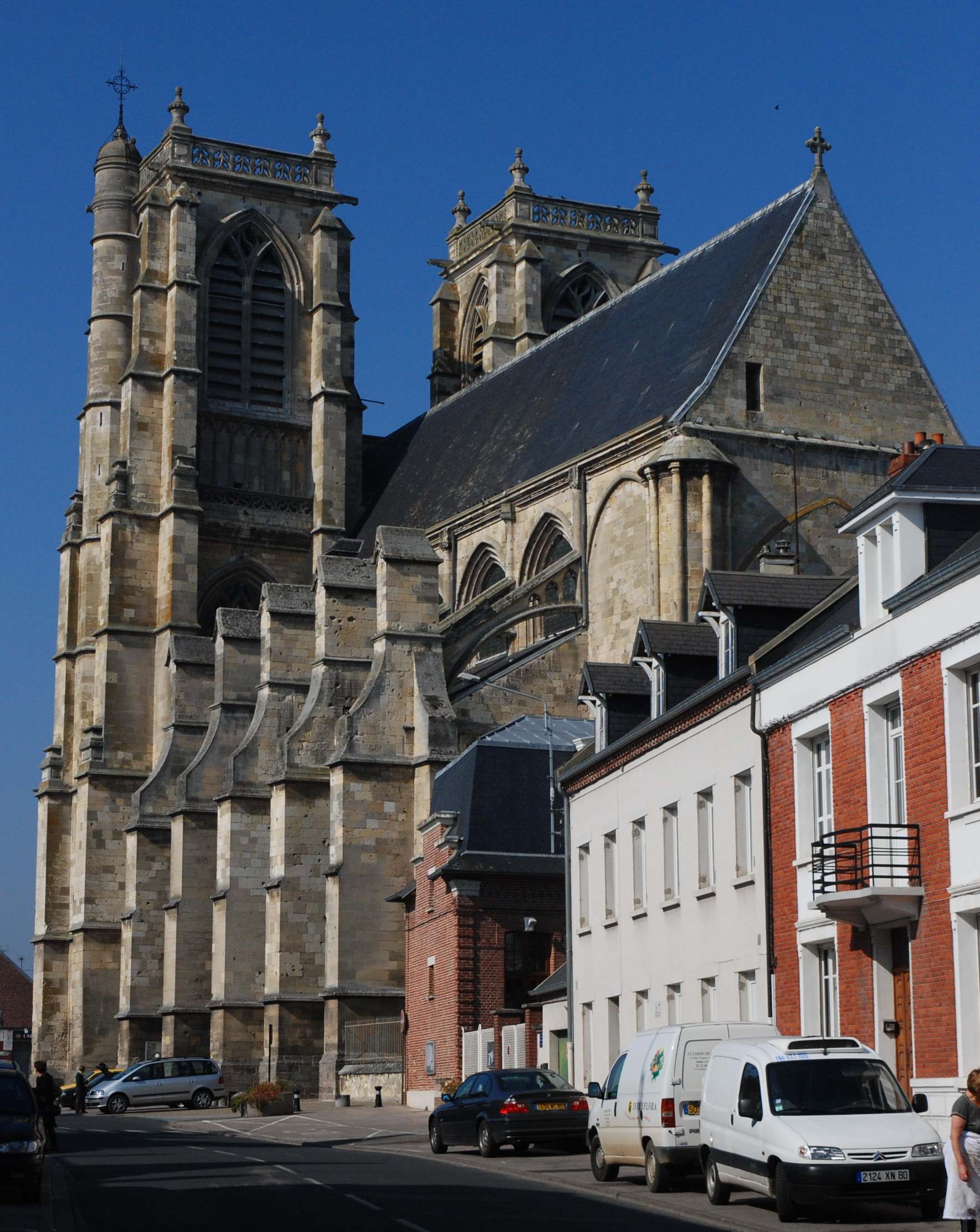
The Abbey church, 18th century

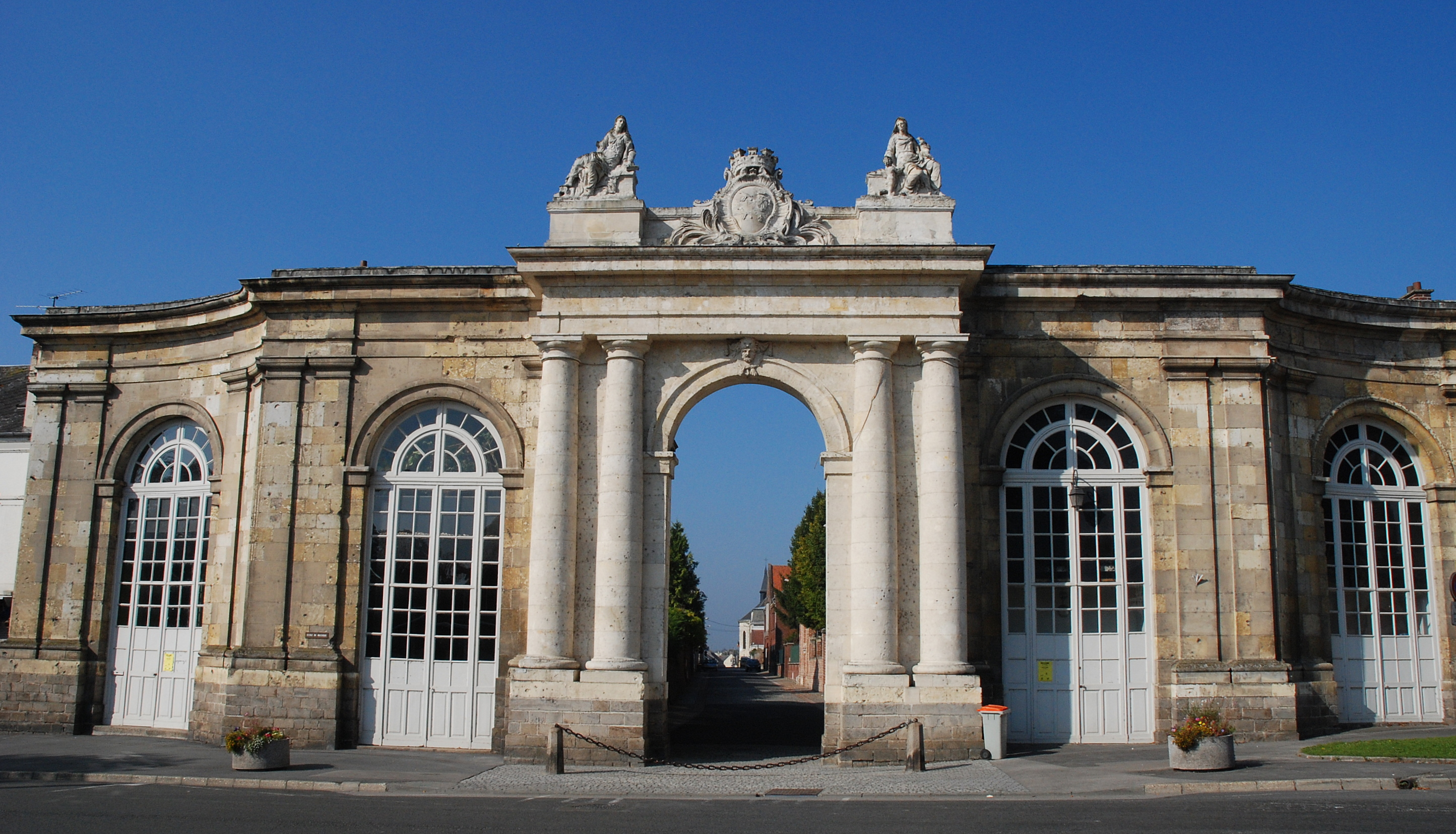
Gate of Honor of the Abbey, 1750

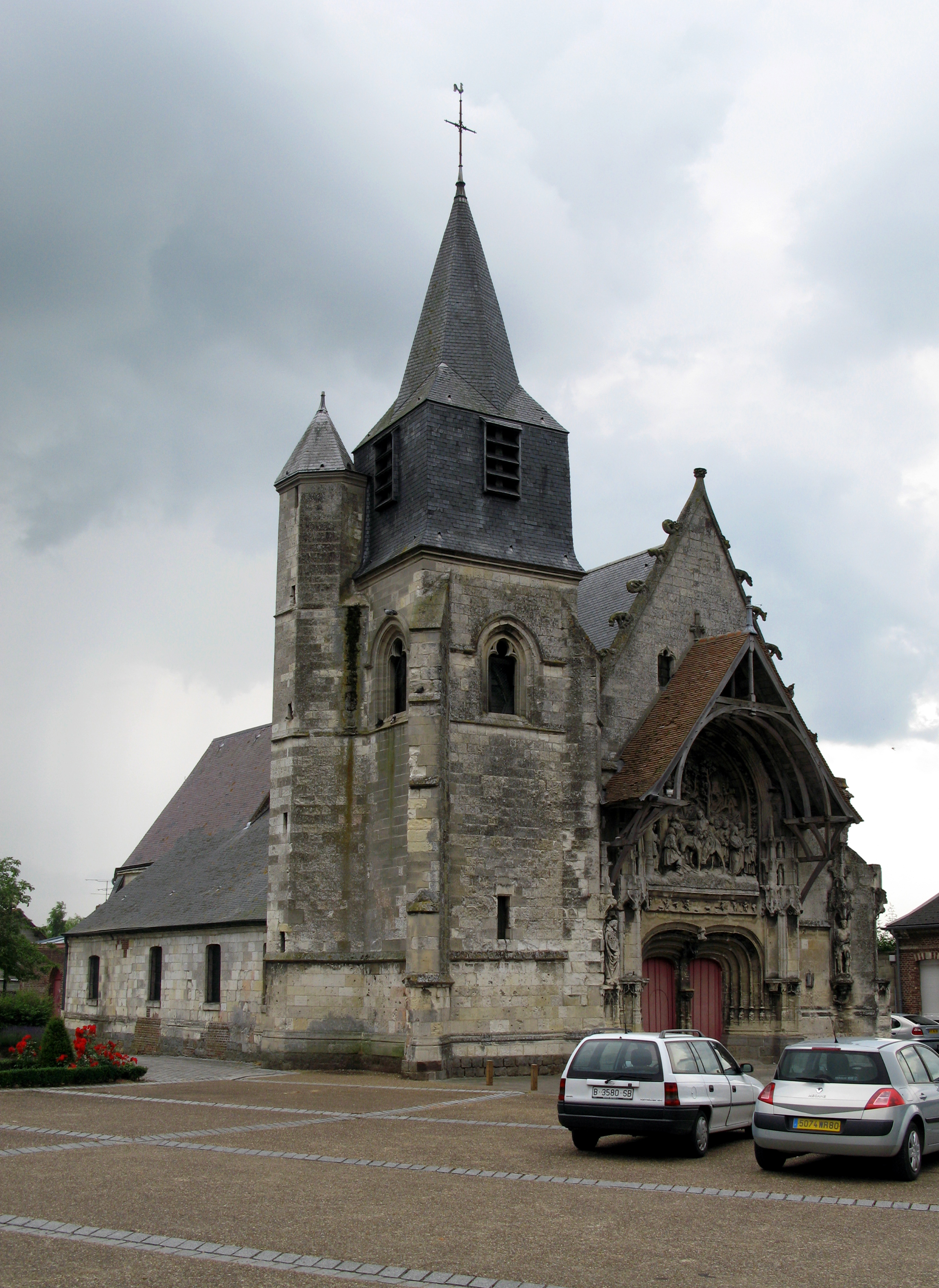
Notre-Dame de la Neuville church, 15th century

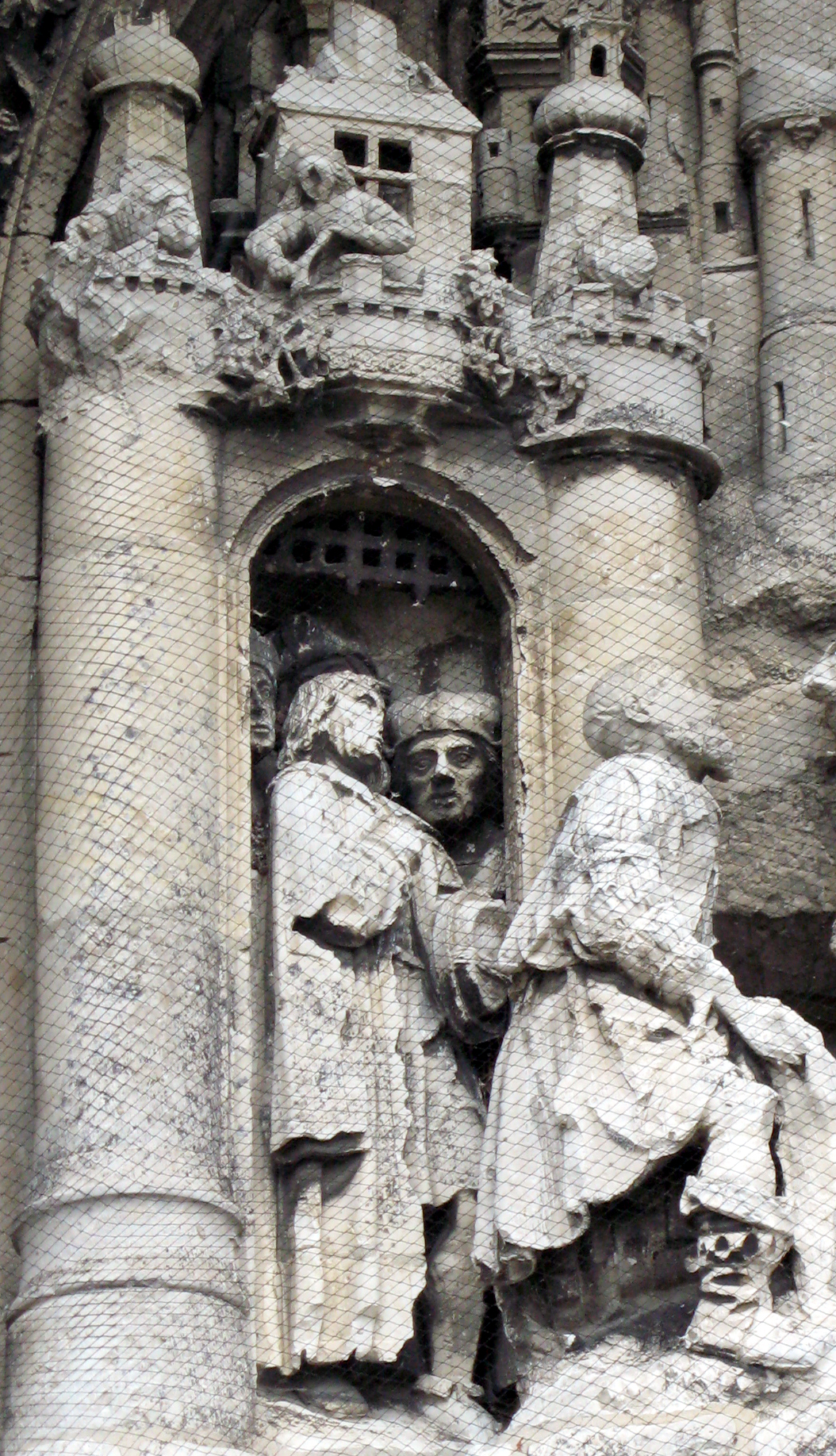
La Neuville church, 15th century, detail

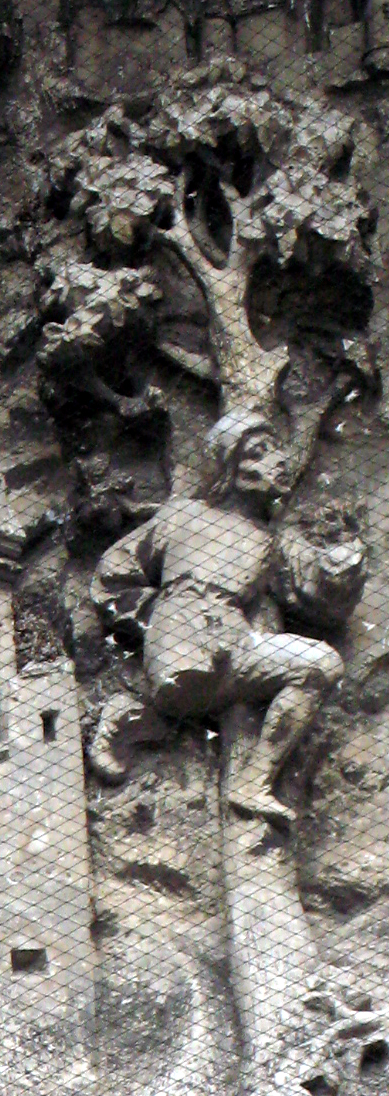
La Neuville church, 15th century, detail

== Sights ==
- Abbey of St. Peter (Saint Pierre)
- Town Hall
- Church of la Neuville; at the north-west end of the town

== Personalities ==
- Adalard of Corbie, a German cousin of Charlemagne, was abbot of Corbie. In 822, he founded Corvey Abbey (Corbeia nova or "new Corbie") on the territory of Höxter in Westphalia.
- Adela of France, Countess of Flanders (1009–1079), countess of Corbie, married Baldwin V, Count of Flanders(c. 1030-1070); their son, Baldwin of Mons became Baldwin VI, Count of Flanders.
- Saint Gérard (born at Corbie in 1025): abbot and confessor.
- Saint Colette (born at Corbie in 1381): reformer of the Franciscan Order
- Eugène Lefebvre, aviation pioneer, born at Corbie 4 October 1878. He was the first pilot to be killed at the controls of his aeroplane, 7 September 1909

== Twin towns ==
- Höxter, Germany
- (United Kingdom) Pickering, Great Britain

== See also ==
- Communes of the Somme department
