= Sailly-Laurette =

- Commune
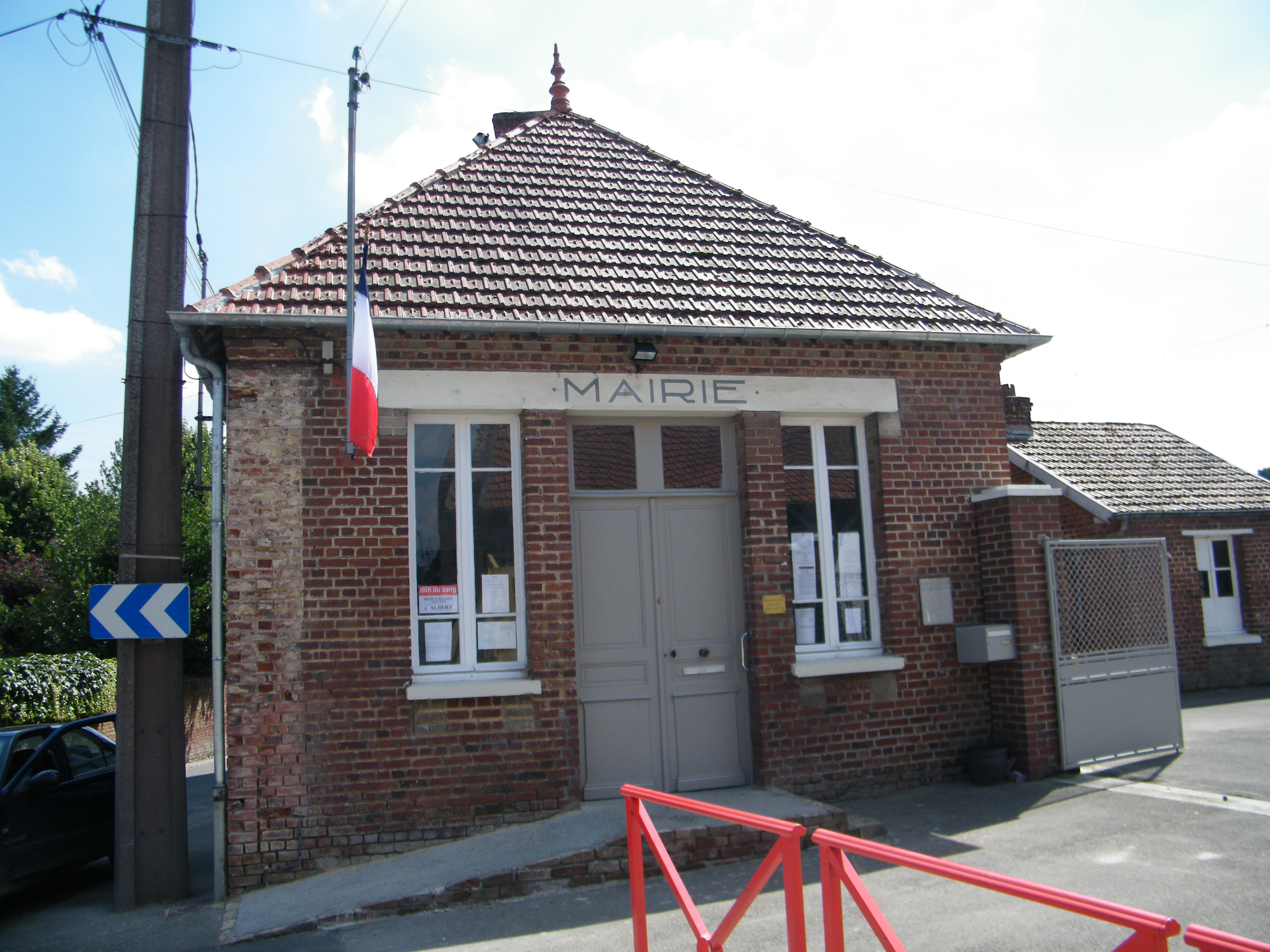
- The town hall in Sailly-Laurette
- Location of Sailly-Laurette
- Location within France Location within Hauts-de-France
- Coordinates: 49°54′46″N 2°36′26″E
- Country: France
- Region: Hauts-de-France
- Department: Somme
- Arrondissement: Amiens
- Canton: Corbie
- Intercommunality: Val de Somme

Government
  - Mayor (2020–2026): Bétina Defretin
- Area^{1}: 6.39 km^{2} (2.47 sq mi)
- Elevation: 25 m (82 ft)
- Highest elevation: 112 m (367 ft)
- Lowest elevation: 31 m (102 ft)
- Population (2023): 333
  - Density: 52.1/km^{2} (135/sq mi)
- Time zone: UTC+01:00 (CET)
  - Summer (DST): UTC+02:00 (CEST)
- INSEE/Postal code: 80693 /80800
- ^{1} French Land Register data, which excludes lakes, ponds, glaciers > 1 km^{2} (0.386 sq mi or 247 acres) and river estuaries.

Sailly-Laurette (French pronunciation: [saji loʁɛt]; Picard: Saillin-Laurette) is a commune in the Somme department in Hauts-de-France in northern France.

== Geography ==
The commune is situated some 15 miles (24 km) east of Amiens, by the banks of the river Somme, where the D42 road crosses.

== Population ==
Historical population
| Year | Pop. | ±% p.a. |
|---|---|---|
| 1968 | 239 | — |
| 1975 | 198 | −2.65% |
| 1982 | 183 | −1.12% |
| 1990 | 228 | +2.79% |
| 1999 | 263 | +1.60% |
| 2007 | 290 | +1.23% |
| 2012 | 314 | +1.60% |
| 2017 | 314 | +0.00% |
| 2023 | 333 | +0.98% |
Source: INSEE

== See also ==
- Communes of the Somme department
