= Méricourt-l'Abbé =

- Commune
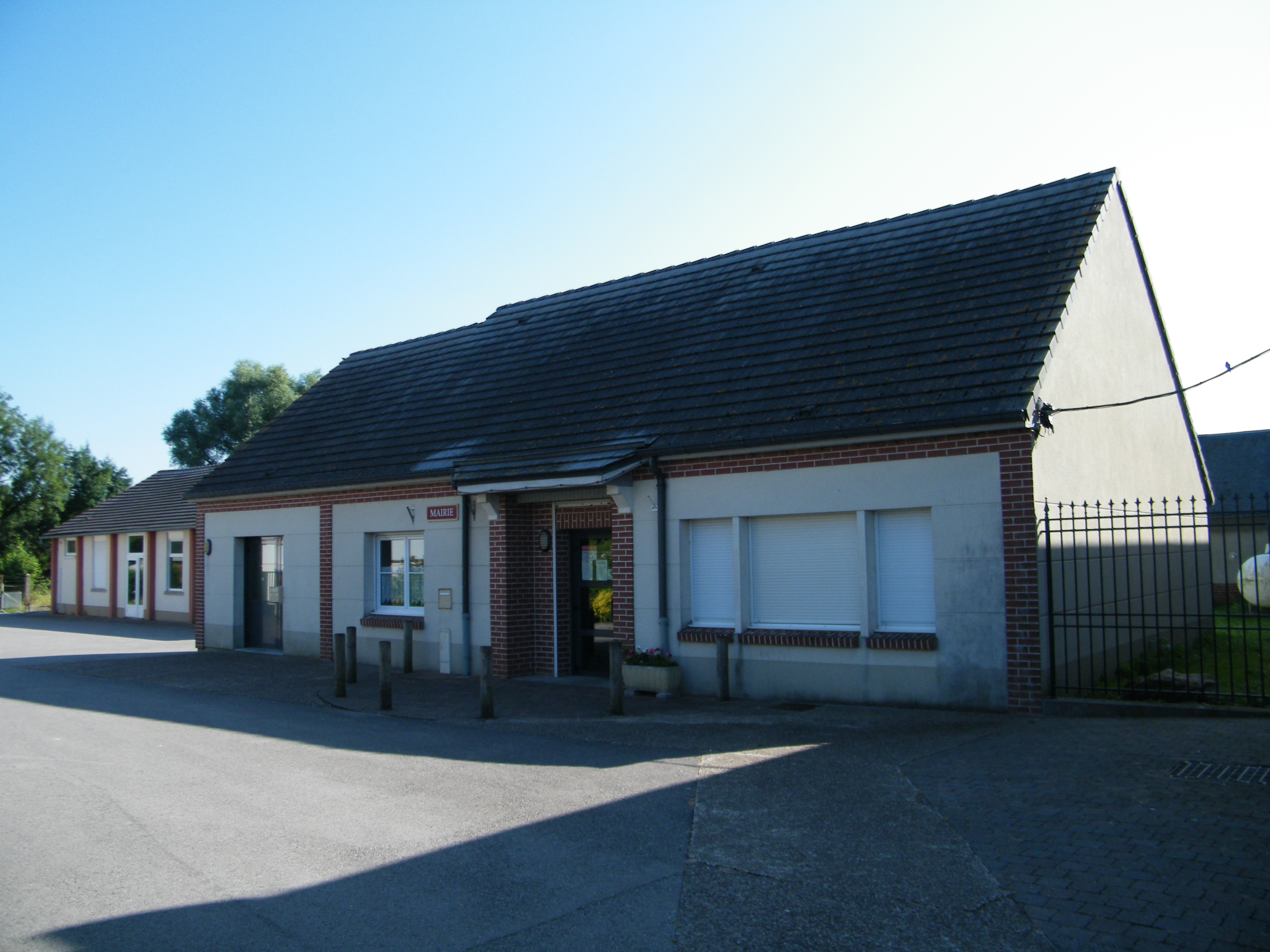
- The town hall in Méricourt-l'Abbé
- Location of Méricourt-l'Abbé
- Location within France Location within Hauts-de-France
- Coordinates: 49°57′09″N 2°33′58″E
- Country: France
- Region: Hauts-de-France
- Department: Somme
- Arrondissement: Amiens
- Canton: Corbie
- Intercommunality: Val de Somme

Government
  - Mayor (2020–2026): Christian De Blangie
- Area^{1}: 6.95 km^{2} (2.68 sq mi)
- Elevation: 38 m (125 ft)
- Highest elevation: 114 m (374 ft)
- Lowest elevation: 33 m (108 ft)
- Population (2023): 587
  - Density: 84.5/km^{2} (219/sq mi)
- Time zone: UTC+01:00 (CET)
  - Summer (DST): UTC+02:00 (CEST)
- INSEE/Postal code: 80530 /80800
- ^{1} French Land Register data, which excludes lakes, ponds, glaciers > 1 km^{2} (0.386 sq mi or 247 acres) and river estuaries.

Méricourt-l'Abbé (French pronunciation: [meʁikuʁ labe]) is a commune in the Somme department in Hauts-de-France in northern France.

== Geography ==
The commune is situated on the D120 road, some 15 miles (24 km) northeast of Amiens, on the banks of the Ancre river.

== Population ==
Historical population
Year	Pop.	±% p.a.
1968	375	—
1975	391	+0.60%
1982	443	+1.80%
1990	443	+0.00%
1999	483	+0.97%
2007	565	+1.98%
2012	583	+0.63%
2017	604	+0.71%
2023	587	−0.47%
Source: INSEE

== See also ==
- Communes of the Somme department
