= Querrieu =

- Commune
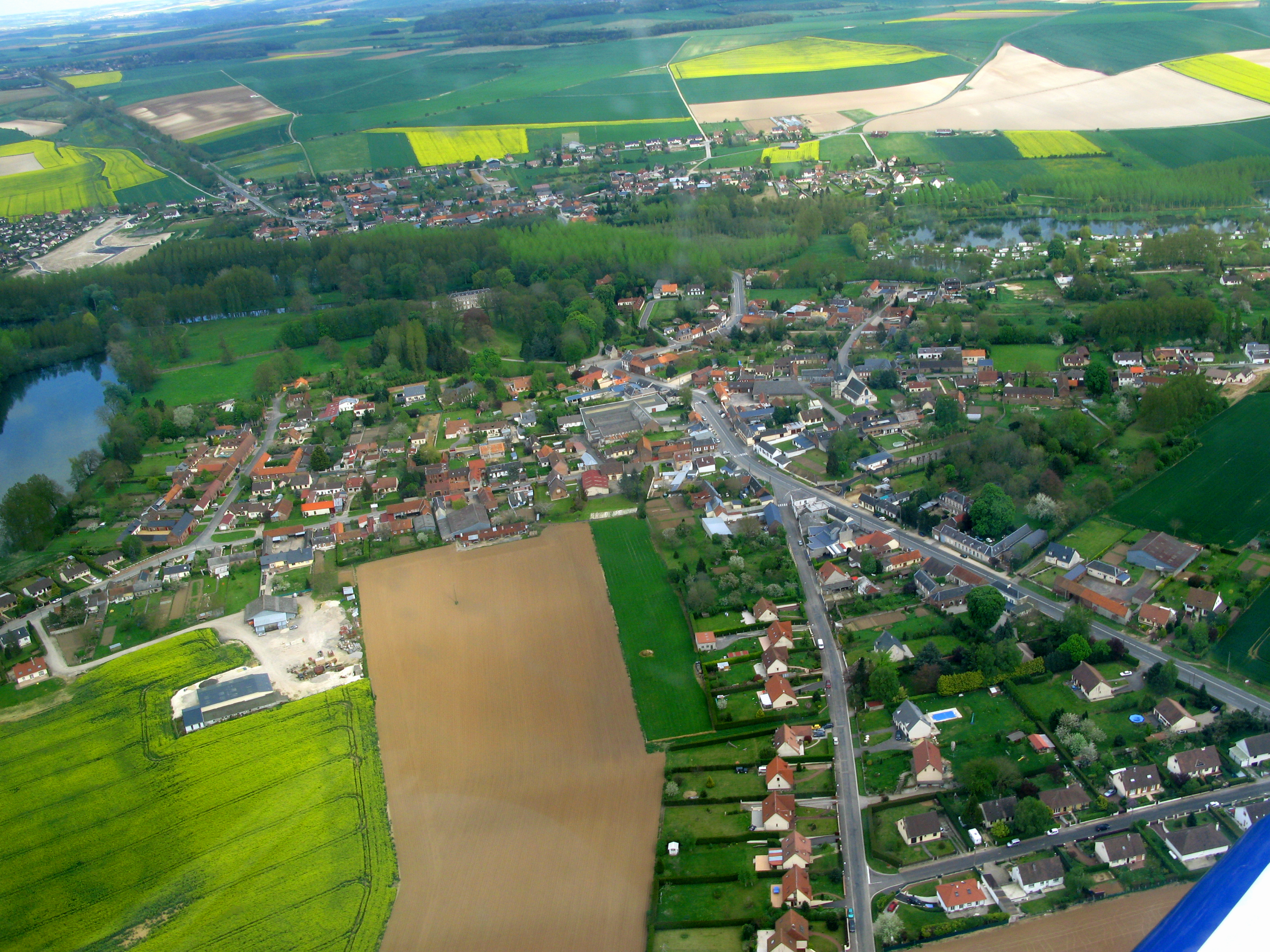
- An aerial view of Querrieu

- Coat of arms
- Location of Querrieu
- Location within France Location within Hauts-de-France
- Coordinates: 49°56′22″N 2°25′53″E
- Country: France
- Region: Hauts-de-France
- Department: Somme
- Arrondissement: Amiens
- Canton: Amiens-2
- Intercommunality: CA Amiens Métropole

Government
  - Mayor (2020–2026): Jonathan Sanglard
- Area^{1}: 10.03 km^{2} (3.87 sq mi)
- Elevation: 40 m (130 ft)
- Highest elevation: 104 m (341 ft)
- Lowest elevation: 32 m (105 ft)
- Population (2023): 626
  - Density: 62.4/km^{2} (162/sq mi)
- Time zone: UTC+01:00 (CET)
  - Summer (DST): UTC+02:00 (CEST)
- INSEE/Postal code: 80650 /80115
- ^{1} French Land Register data, which excludes lakes, ponds, glaciers > 1 km^{2} (0.386 sq mi or 247 acres) and river estuaries.

Querrieu (French pronunciation: [kɛʁjø]) is a commune in the Somme department in Hauts-de-France in northern France.

== Geography ==
Querrieu is situated on the D 929 road, some 7 miles (11 km) northeast of Amiens, on the banks of the river Hallue. It is bordered by Fréchencourt on the north, Pont-Noyelles on the east, Bussy-lès-Daours on the south and Allonville on the west.

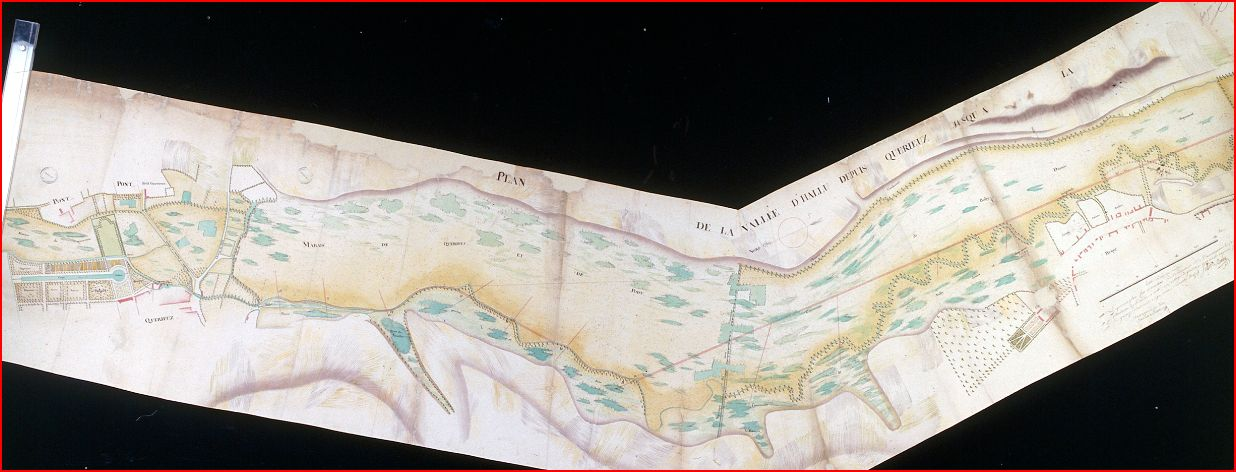
Valley of the river Hallue, between Querrieu and Bussy-lès-Daours

== History ==
=== Henri IV battle ===
After Amiens was invaded and taken by Spanish Netherlanders on 11 March 1597, Henri IV besieged the town with a considerable army. On 29 August he was notified of the approach of a significant Spanish force (four companies of arquebuse-men and 300 mounted soldiers), protecting a supplies convoy. The King sallied from his camp north of Amiens, accompanied by Biron, de Lagrange-Montigny, the count of Auvergne, and headed toward the enemy train. Leading an escort of 50 soldiers, he spotted Spanish scouts emerging from the Querrieu forest. He charged them at full gallop, with his escorts close behind. The startled Spanish group assumed they were being attacked by a large force, and beat a hasty retreat. The King pursued his adversaries, who abandoned two sous-lieutenants, 200 horsemen and numerous prisoners.

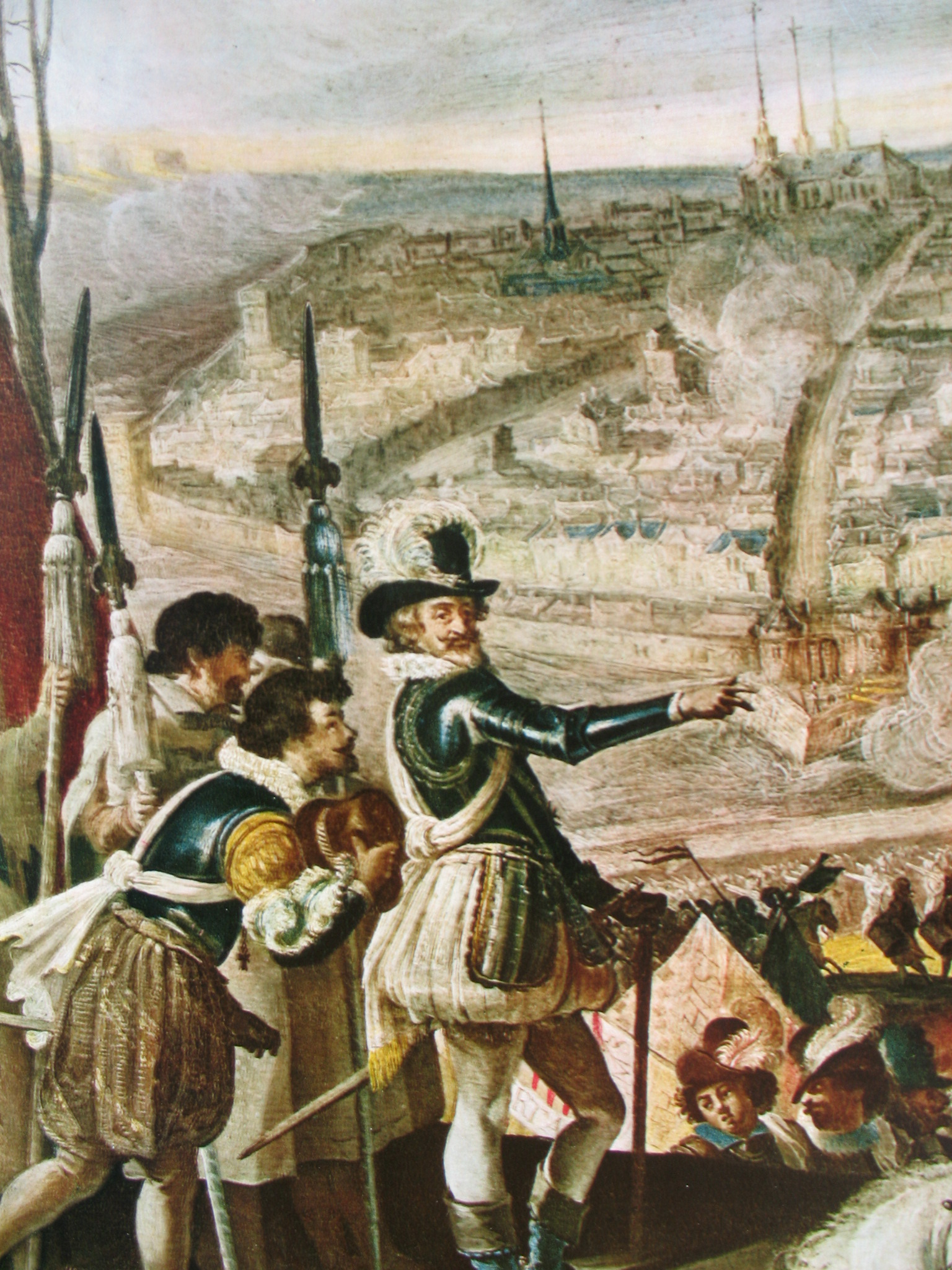
King Henri IV in front of Amiens fortifications, April 1597

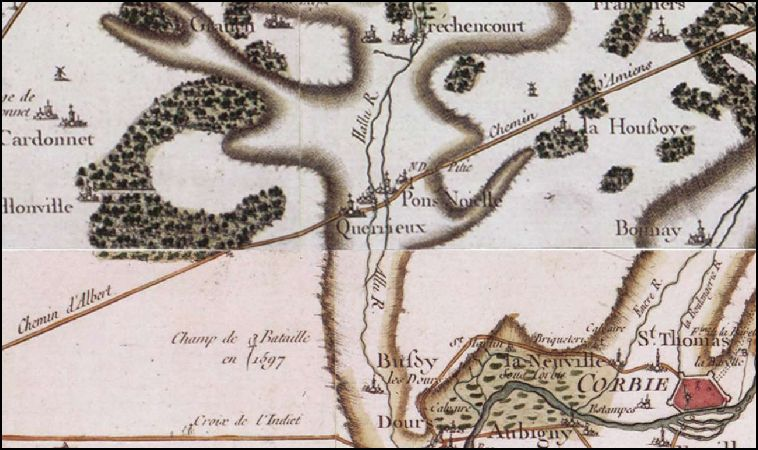
1597 battlefield location

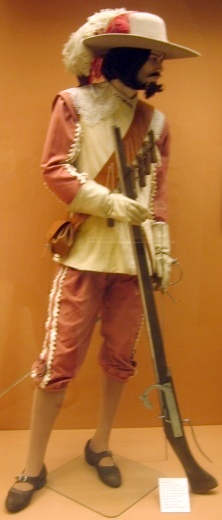
Spanish arquebus-man

=== Franco-Prussian War 1870–1871 ===
During the Franco-Prussian War, the town and fortress of Amiens were occupied by the Prussian Army in November 1870. On 16 December the French Northern Army, led by General Faidherbe, took a position on the hills bordering the left side of the river Hallue.

==== Skirmish on Querrieu ====
General Manteuffel took command of the Prussian Army on 20 December, and that same day launched a troop and a battalion, about two thousand men, toward Querrieu. On the eastern skirts of the wood, two kilometres in front of the village, they encountered French outposts and engaged in battle. Three companies of French line infantry, coming from Bussy-lès-Daours, counter-attacked the right flank of the Prussian force, which retreated to Amiens. In this confrontation the Prussian losses were 3 officers and 69 men killed or wounded; the French losses were 7 killed and 20 wounded.

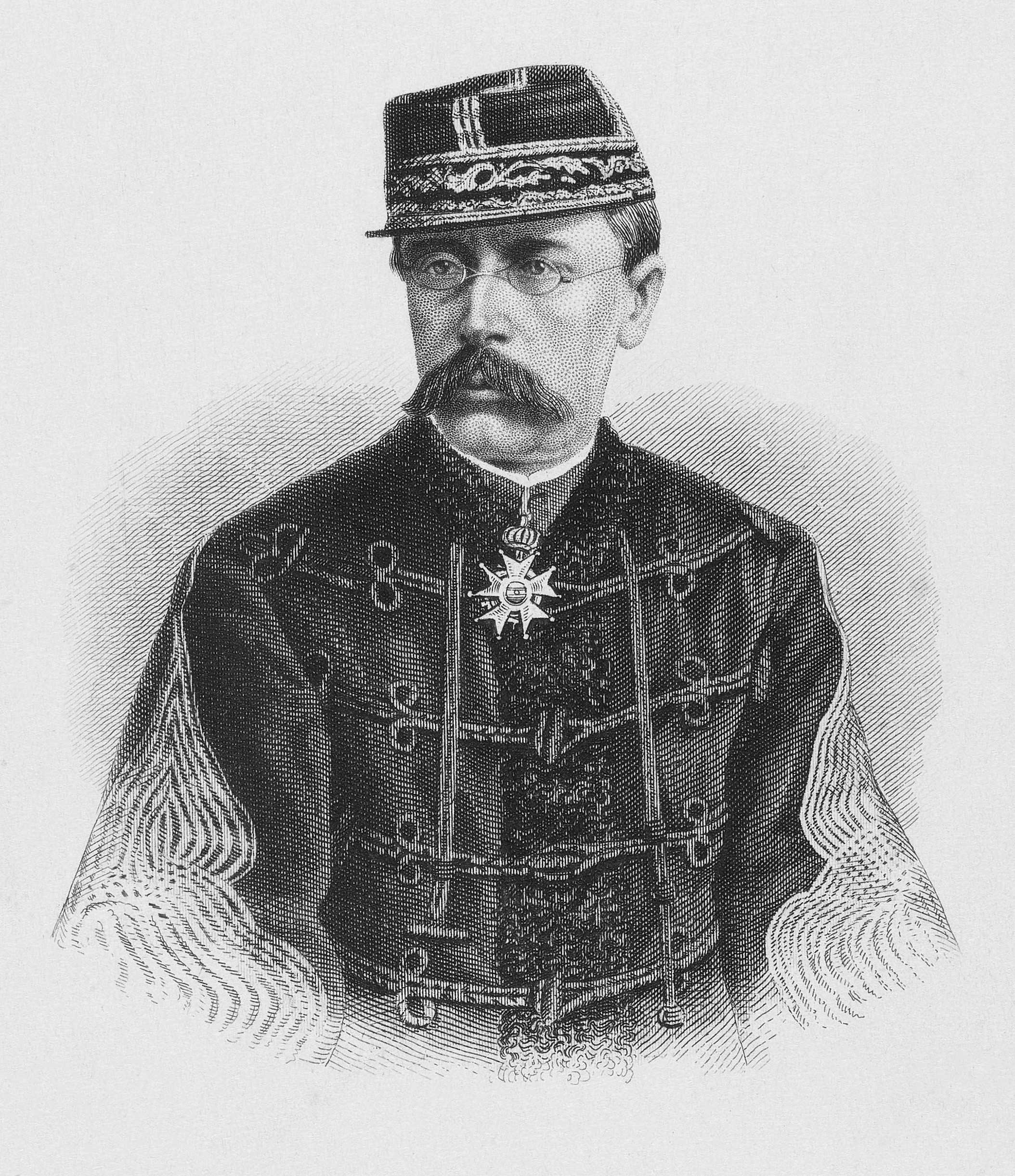
Général Faidherbe, 1860 portrait

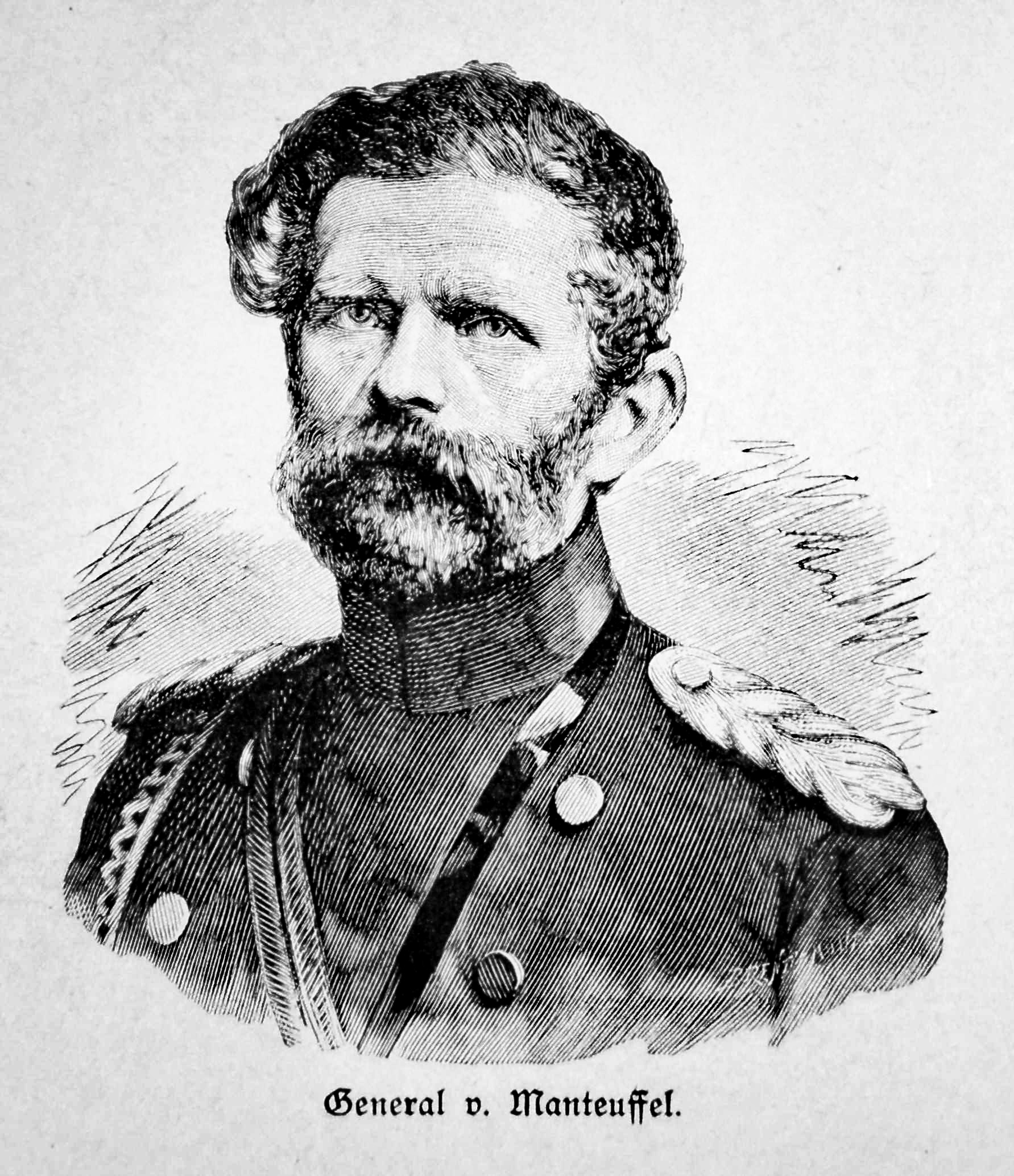
Général Manteuffel

==== Battle of Hallue ====
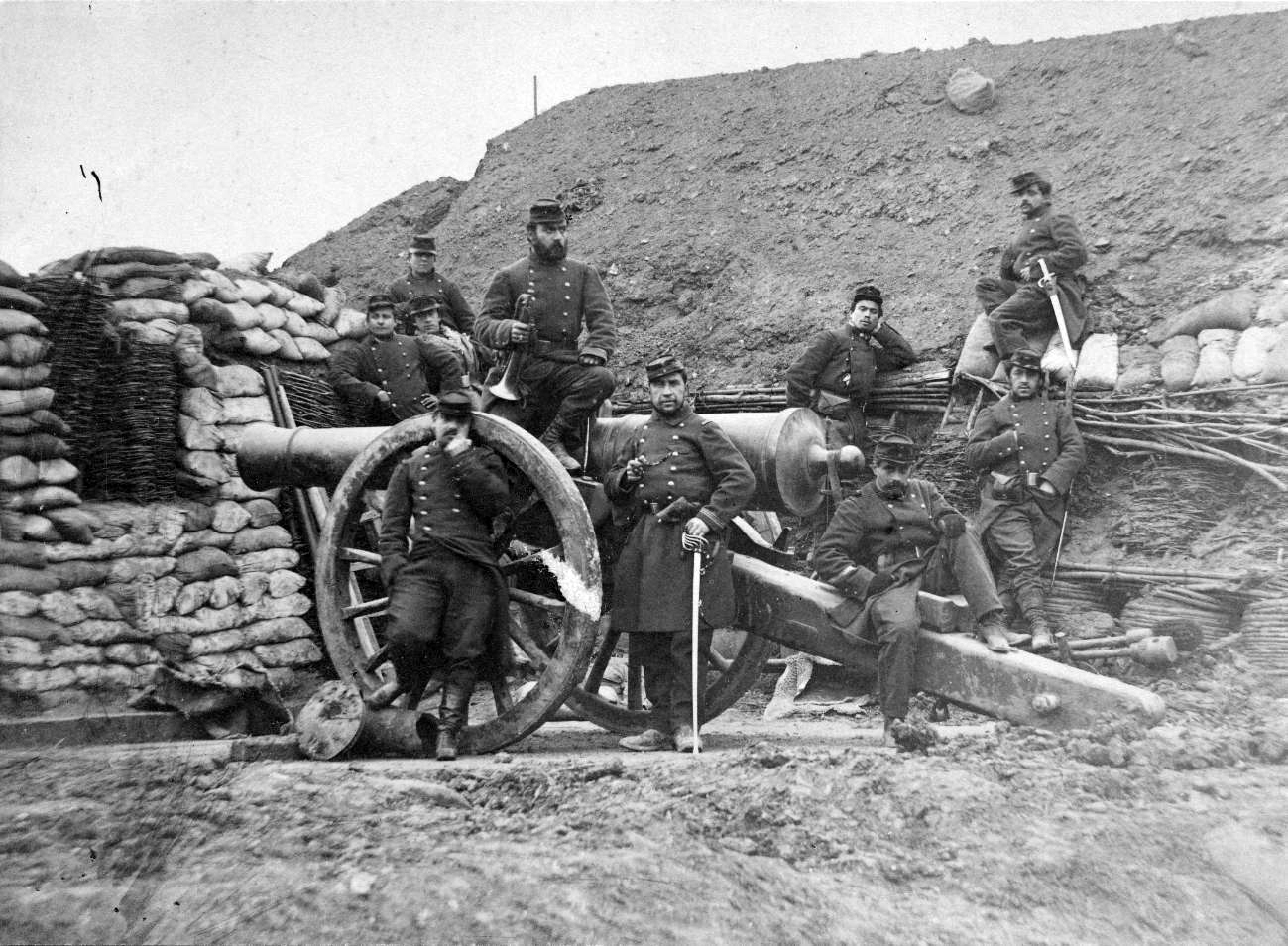
French gun in action

On 23 December 23 the Prussian General (Manteuffel) led an offensive toward the river Hallue, along a line of twelve kilometres from Contay to Daours, on a snow-covered earth in an icy temperature, worsened by a northern wind. By midmorning the Prussians had possession of the wood and the village of Querrieu. Prussian field batteries on the heights of the village along the main road, fired on French positions at Pont-Noyelles. The French guns responded, and several shells hit houses in Querrieu.

In the afternoon, forty-two Prussian guns are in battery between Querrieu and Bussy-lès-Daours. At about 3:30 p.m. the Prussians launch a mass attack. They make headway into Pont-Noyelles but are stopped at the eastern border of the village. A counter-attack push them back into Querrieu where they establish their bivouac for the night. During this night, the French Northern Army start off a movement towards Albert and Bapaume.

In the communal cemetery of Querrieu, mortal remains of French and Prussian soldiers were gathered in two collective graves.

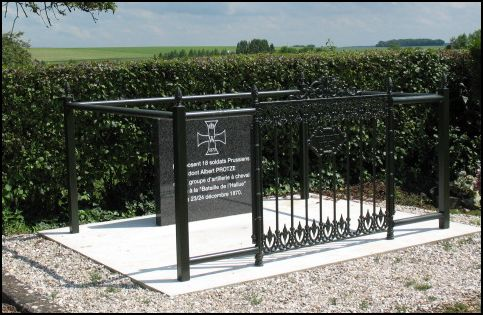

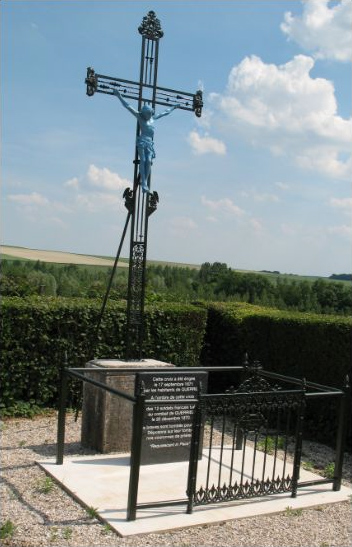

=== World War I ===
==== Battle of the Somme, 1916 ====
In 1916, the Headquarters of the 4th British army, led by General Rawlinson, was set up in the castle of Querrieu. On 1 July 1916, General Haig, commander of the British Forces in France, is poised to attack. After a heavy artillery barrage the British troops advance from their trenches toward the German line. However, the barrage failed to destroy the distant German artillery, which then opened return fire on the advancing troops. Thus began the British infantry's most murderous battle of the war.

During that summer several notables came through the area, including General Foch, and Arthur Balfour, former British Prime minister. On 10 August the entire Headquarters staff gathered around British King George V, who presented decorations to French Generals Fayolle and Balfourier. The Sovereign was accompanied by his son, the young Prince of Wales, future king Edward VIII, then Duke of Windsor after less than a year of reign.

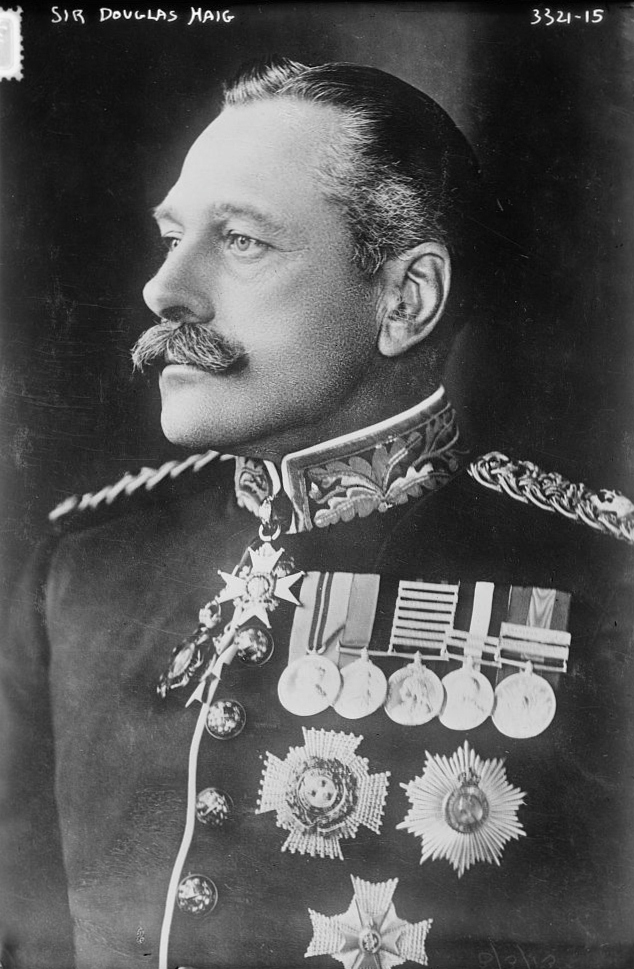
General Douglas Haig

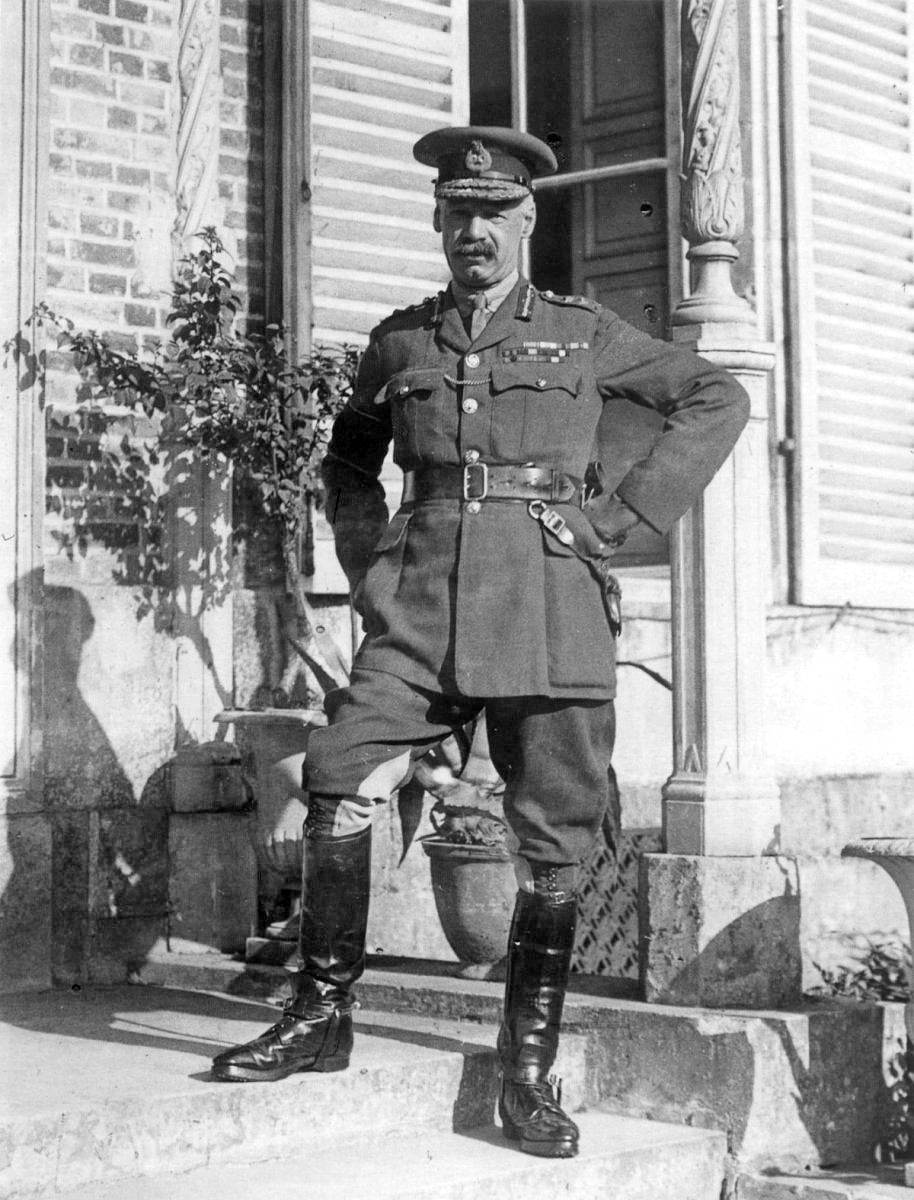
General Rawlinson in front of Querrieu castle, 1916

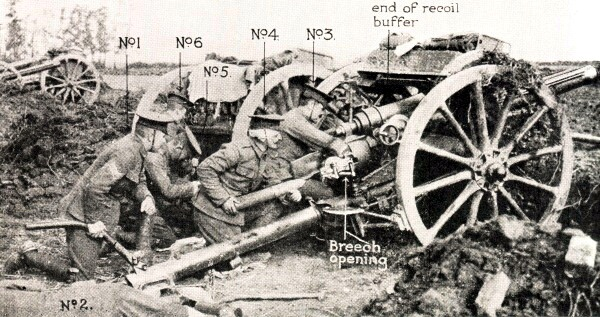
18 pounder in action

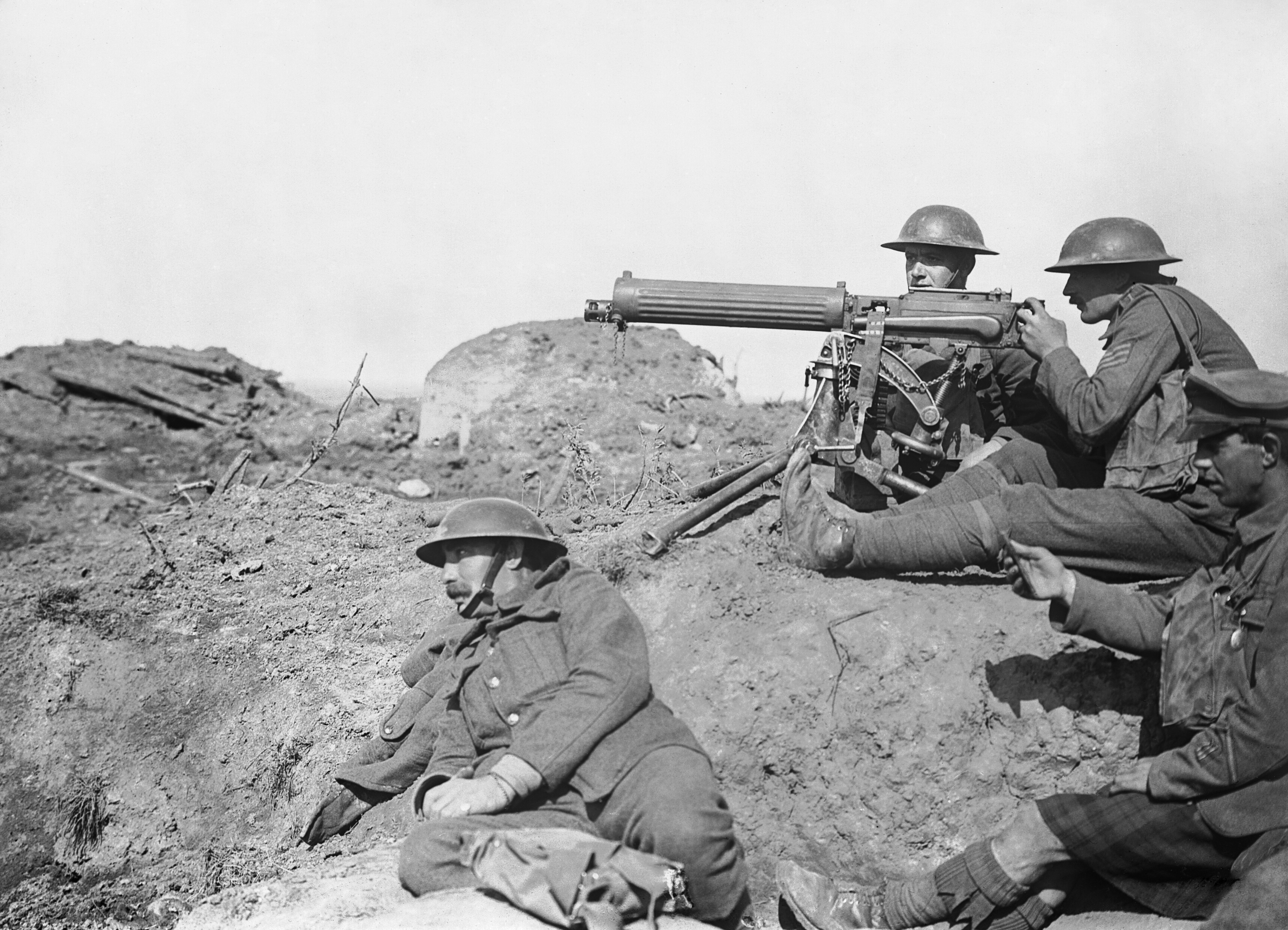
Vickers machine gun in action, Somme 1916

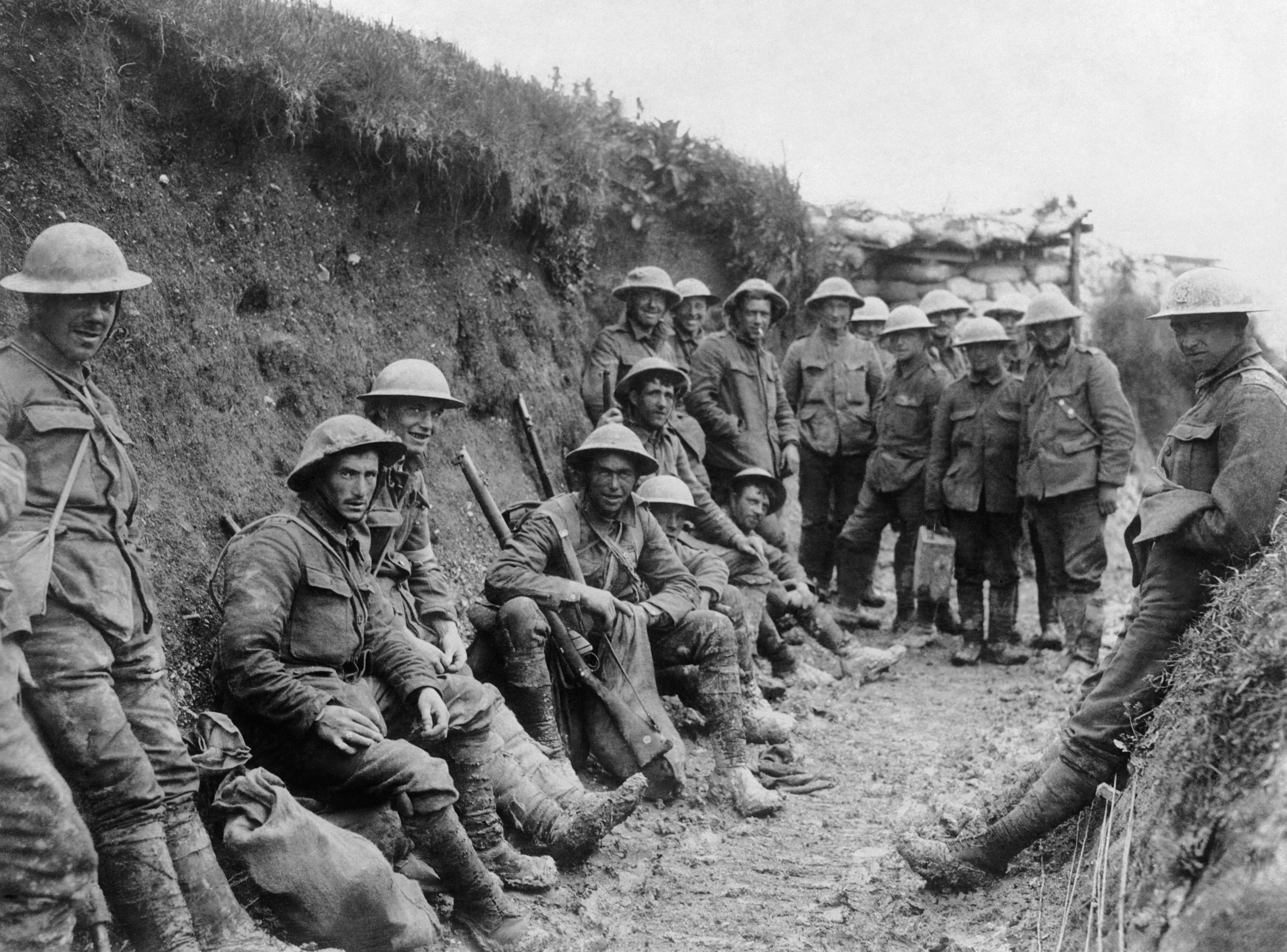
Royal Irish Rifles ration party, July 1916 Somme

==== German offensive, Spring 1918 ====
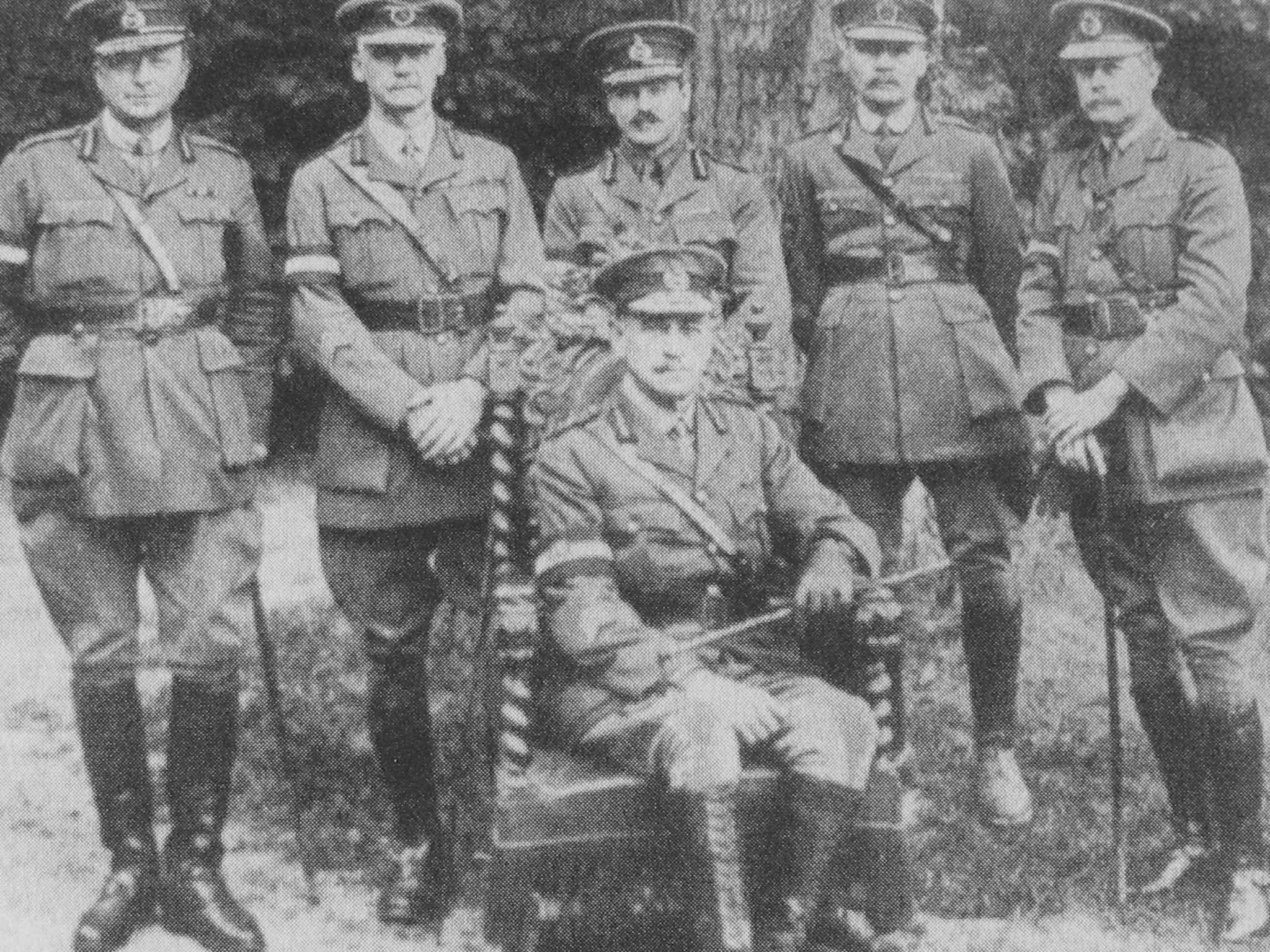
General Monash and staff, 31 May 1918

On 21 March 1918, the German launched a major offensive along the Western Front. After a few days, their advance began to falter. Fresh British and Australian units were moved to the vital rail center of Amiens. Numerous British units were stationed in and around Querrieu, in a military concentration area. On 31 May

On May 31, General John Monash assumed command of the Australian Corps and set his Headquarters in the castle of Saint-Gratien, four kilometres north of Querrieu.

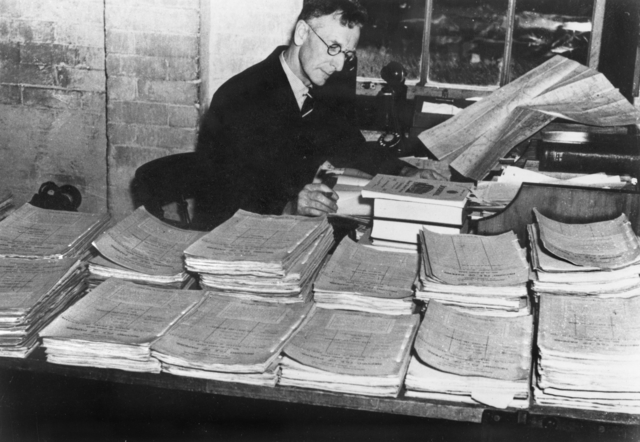
Charles Bean with files in 1935

In May 1918, in the lower part of the village, the living space of a brewery near the Hallue river was occupied by several Australian war correspondents, among them Charles W. W. Bean, who would write the "Official History of Australia in the war 1914–1918". Outbuildings on the grounds were occupied by a company of the 21st Australian infantry battalion, who take the name of "Querrieu brewery company". One of the war correspondents (C. W. W. Bean himself ?) described the events taking place during a day for all men of the company. (Full text in: Official History of Australia in the war 1914–1918, volume VI, chapter I, pp. 8–18)

On 4 July General Monash launched a combined attack of artillery, tanks, infantry and air forces toward Le Hamel, a position overlooking the German forces in Villers-Bretonneux. The 21st battalion gained possession of three German trenches. During this attack, the Querrieu brewery company formed the left wing of the battalion.

On 20 July, in front of the castle of Querrieu, General Monash awarded commendations and medals to the 4th infantry Division which distinguished itself during the battle of Le Hamel, with the loss of 24 officers and 240 men.

A British siege battery, set north of the village, launched a barrage on the German positions of Villers-Bretonneux. The German artillery responded, destroying houses and farms, and severely damaged the church.

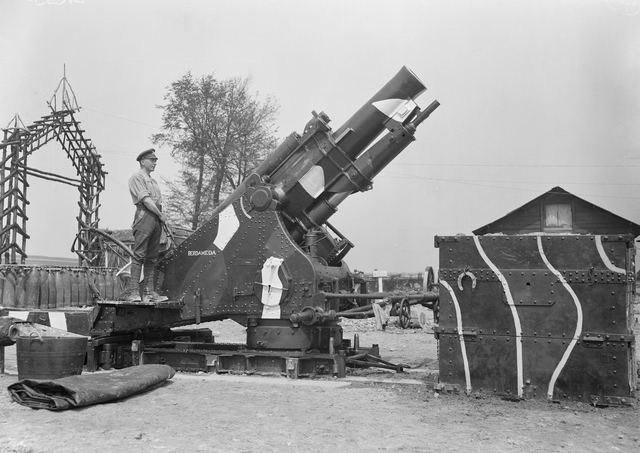
British siege artillery : 9.2 inch Howitzer supporting the Australian Corps in May 1918 near the Somme

On 27 March 1918, the 2nd Australian Tunneling Company was billeted at Querrieu. One of its first actions was the creation of a cemetery, in which eight of its men will be buried from 9 April to 13 June. This cemetery was closed in August; 103 Australian and British soldiers are buried there.

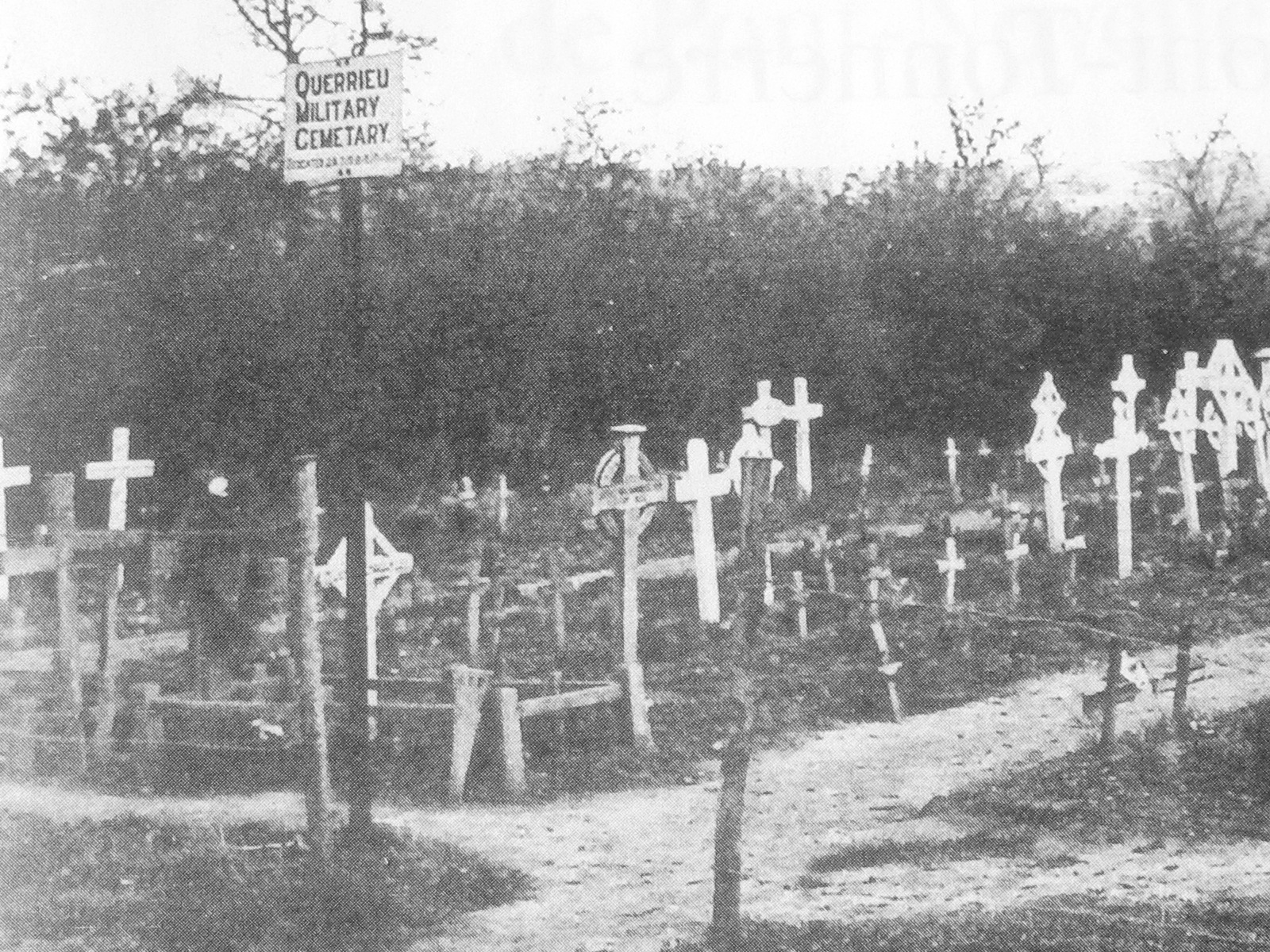
Querrieu British cemetery, 1918

== Population ==
Historical population

Year	Pop.	±% p.a.
1700	370	—
1724	235	−1.87%
1726	250	+3.14%
1760	390	+1.32%
1772	350	−0.90%
1793	617	+2.74%
1800	755	+2.93%
1806	856	+2.11%
1821	773	−0.68%
1831	857	+1.04%
1836	903	+1.05%
1841	916	+0.29%
1846	860	−1.25%
1851	831	−0.68%
1856	815	−0.39%
1861	830	+0.37%
1866	823	−0.17%
1872	806	−0.35%
1876	776	−0.94%
1881	848	+1.79%
1886	776	−1.76%

Year	Pop.	±% p.a.
1891	694	−2.21%
1896	662	−0.94%
1901	622	−1.24%
1906	623	+0.03%
1911	540	−2.82%
1921	457	−1.66%
1926	480	+0.99%
1931	467	−0.55%
1936	480	+0.55%
1946	493	+0.27%
1954	487	−0.15%
1962	493	+0.15%
1968	508	+0.50%
1975	544	+0.98%
1982	583	+0.99%
1990	643	+1.23%
1999	687	+0.74%
2007	690	+0.05%
2012	657	−0.98%
2017	648	−0.28%
2023	626	−0.57%

Source: EHESS and INSEE

== Sports ==
=== Golf ===
Owned by the Golf Club d'Amiens, the golf course is situated on the south of Querrieu wood. It opened as a nine-hole course, and is at present an eighteen-hole course of 6114 metres. The large clubhouse serves the large membership (590 at present) and course players.

== Ancient activities ==
=== Water mill ===
==== From its origins to the Revolution ====
A seigniorial property, the flour mill is on the right bank of the Hallue River. It has been mentioned in extant documents dating from the thirteenth century, charters regulating relations between seigniories for its use, rents and obligations. In 1792, "le moulin à bled tournant et travaillant" is hired for 2000 livres per year by the "ci-devant" seignior, but the miller abandoned the lease after three years, citing difficult competition from three wind-mills which had been recently erected in the village.

==== The mill in 1812 ====
By 1812 the mill was in disrepair. In that year the owner (the ci-devant seignior), encouraged by an agricultural renewal, made significant repairs.

===== General view =====
The mill house, built of bricks and tile covered, contains the mill machinery. The river water course is elevated to have sufficient energy for the undershot wheel moving inside a diversion dam beside the river's natural course. Sluice gates control water levels.

===== Mill machinery =====
The machinery is made of wood.

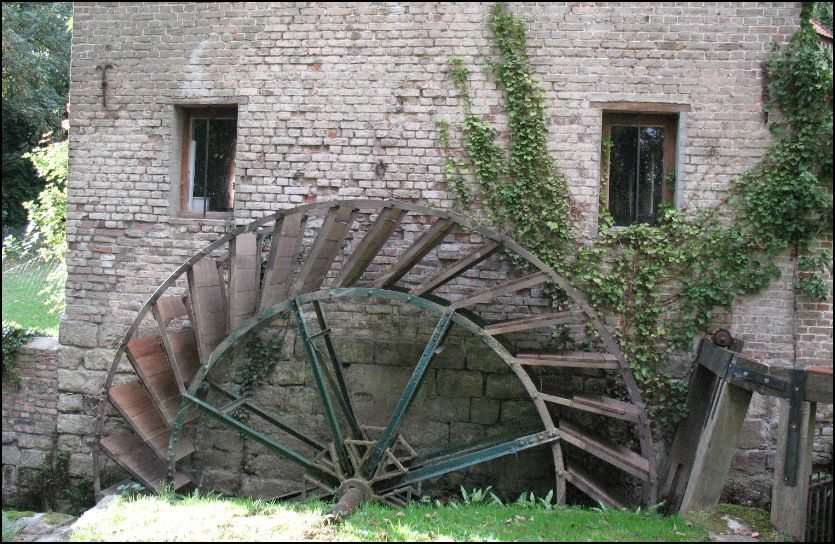
Querrieu, the wheel-mill

The waterwheel, with 28 paddles, is mounted on a 40 cm-diameter axle. Motion of the waterwheel is transferred to the runner stone, which is made to rotate faster than the waterwheel. There are two mill stones, the bed stone at the bottom and the runner stone. The iron-bound bed stone is formed of seven pieces of sandstone. The iron-bound runner stone is formed of nine pieces of sandstone with a hole in its center in which the grain can run off from a bin on the upper floor of the mill-house. The grain is crushed between the two stones; flour and bran are collected in a peripheral bin and fall into a bolting reel to be separated. Eventually the bran is crushed to obtain a second quality flour.

Near the end of the nineteenth century the wooden components were replaced by pieces fabricated from iron. Milling operations ceased in 1914; after that the machinery was utilized as a sawmill until 1940.

===== Millers =====
From fathers to sons, a family of millers worked this mill from 1812 to 1914.

=== Sugar refinery ===
In April 1874, on the territory of Querrieu, a sugar beet refinery named "La Sucrerie" was established. Its location was selected due to the intersecting roads (from nearby beet farms) and a nearby water source. Harvested beets are hauled to the factory after they have been weighed and analyzed for sugar content.

==== Mechanical process ====
A 35CV steam-engine drove hoisting-gear, a washing machine, a shredding machine, and various pumps. After being washed the beets are shredded and spread on screens. The screens are pressed to extract the juice. The residue is the pulp.

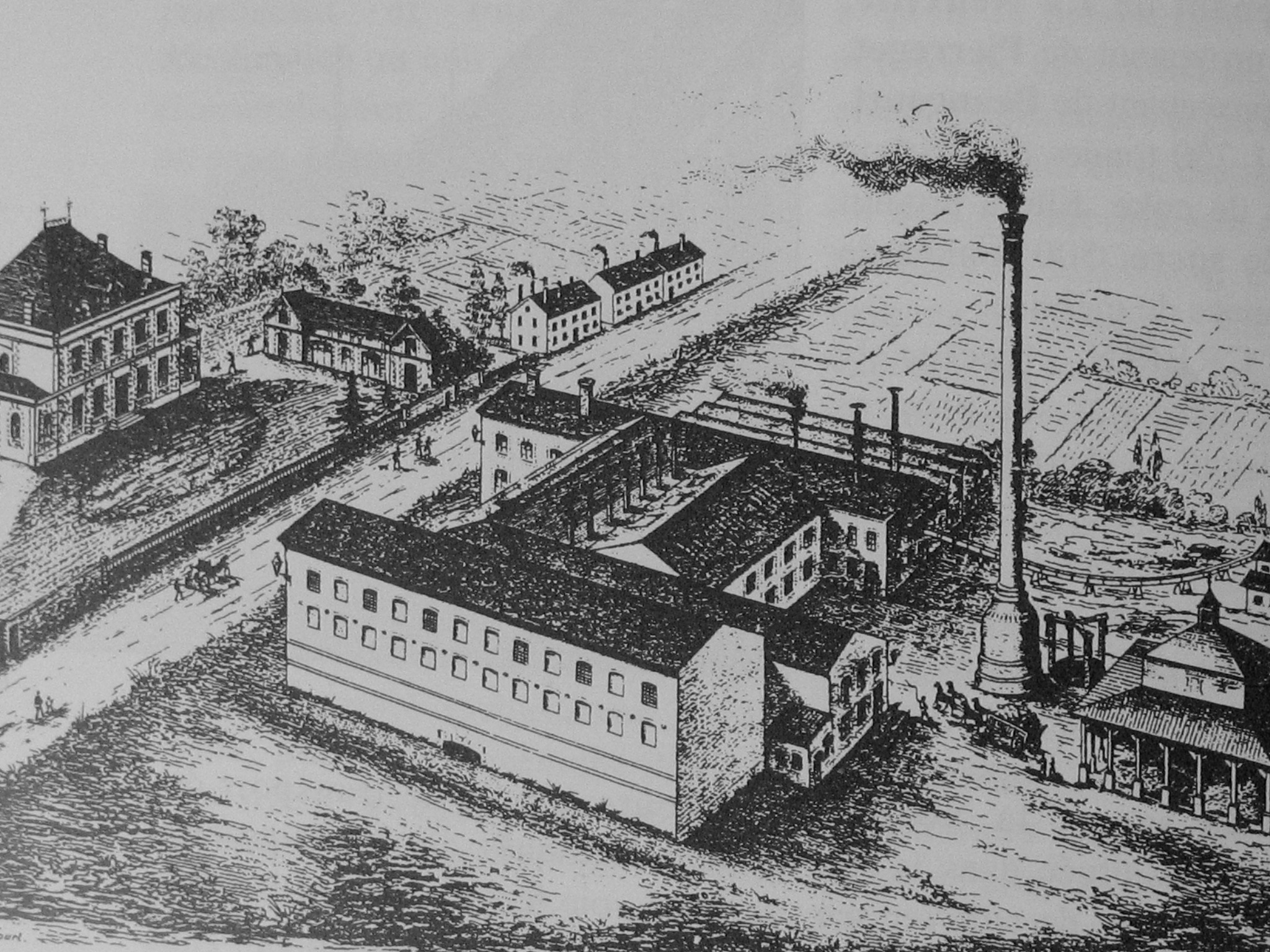
Querrieu, the beet refinery in 1880

==== Chemical process ====
Some bone-black is introduced into the juice raised to the temperature of 80 °C, to eliminate the coloured substances. Some lime, produced in an oven settled close to the workshops, is added to neutralize the acids. Sulphuric acid is then added introduced to transform the lime excess in sulphates forming some outer-coating.

==== Physical process ====
The syrup is passing through a condenser battery where the evaporation is activated by a cooling obtained by an important cold water flow. This condense battery evaporates 2500 hectolitres of juice per day. Granulated sugar obtained after evaporation is shaped into the moulds for its commercialization.

In 1876, the production was of : 800 metric tons of sugar, 500 metric tons of pulp and 400 metric tons of molasse.

==== Staff ====
A hamlet was created close to the factory : a cottage for the manager, eight houses for a foreman, a supervisor, a book keeper, three firemen, a mason and four workers. The seasonal workers may board in an inn, near the hamlet.

==== Activity cessation ====
Far away from any railway or waterway and having to cope with municipality protestations for damages on their roads involved by the heavy waggons during the rainy season, the factory is unable to develop any extension.

In addition to these difficulties, competing with some more important factories using new production techniques and having better profit earning, the Company falls in bankruptcy in September 1883.

Recovered by a shareholder, the factory goes on working until 1890, before its end of all activity.

=== Textiles ===
Making use of a William Lee invention, stocking frame spread out in Amiens with high quality wools prescribed by the local weaver guild. To get round the rule and obtain lower cost produce, a family of stocking makers (faiseurs de bas au métier) settled down in Querrieu about the middle of the 18th century, the wool coming from local sheep-farming, carding and spinning being carried out by craftsmen of the village. The names of eleven stocking makers appear on the 1836 census.

==== Knitting ====
About 1850, some knitting workshops, making use of original English knitting machines Mule-jenny invented by Samuel Crompton, were operating in Querrieu. In 1881, ninety-eight knitters (men and women) in workshops or at home, live in the village. The last workshop opened in 1925, was running with machines driven by electrical engines; all activities ceased in 1950.

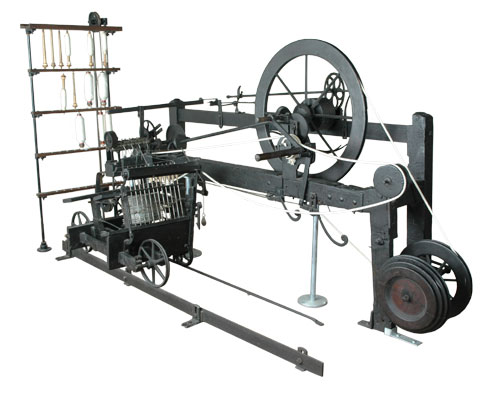
Mule-jenny used in French knitting workshops

== Places of interest ==
=== Castle ===
At an indeterminate time, but probably in order to fight the Norsemen invaders in the 10th century, a fortress was built on the right bank of the river Hallue, close to the Gallo-Roman road Amiens-Bapaume. It was a dark and heavy building in thick walls of bricks, pierced of rare and narrow holes. Wide ditches and deep ponds defended approach of the fortress on which the access was only possible by a drawbridge. The ground floor was in strong sandstone and heavy towers covered in dome, defended the fortified manor.

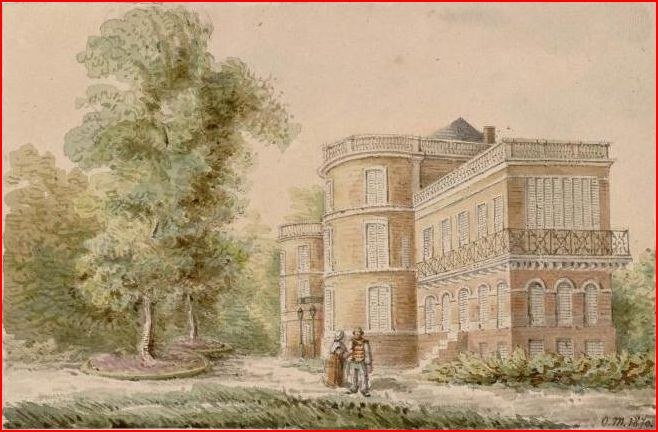
Castle of Querrieu. Aquarelle by Oswald Macqueron, 1870

At the setting up of the seigniory in marquisate in 1653, the fortress was fit up in a seigniorial castle.

After the death of her husband in 1735, Anne-Françoise Perrin, dowager marquess, undertakes to change the fortress into a building pleasant to live in. The new castle consists in a main part formed by a ground-floor surmounted by a storey, enclosed by two turrets in fore-parts built over the subfoundations in sandstone of the two old towers, and prolonged by two pavilions on extremities. The new castle is preceded by a courtyard bordered by walls and bars. French style gardens with a large basin are spreading on the rear.

After the death of Louis François de Gaudechart in 1832, his widow, Princess Clémentine Charlotte de Rohan-Rochefort, embellishes the castle and its surroundings. An extra storey and attics were added to the main part of the building, the whole crowded by a balustrade in white stone. The park surrounding the castle was extensively enlarged; a new enclosure in stones and bricks was built and a large iron gate opening to the village. All these arrangements are subsisting nowadays.

Most parts of inside ornaments come from the nineteenth century, particularly panellings of the ground-floor rooms, and inlaid-work of parquetry.

During World War I, the castle was occupied by several British and Australian military Head Quarters. After the murderous Bullecourt battle, on April 11 and May 13, 1917, Sir William Ridell Birdwood, commandant of the Australian Corps on the West front, came to stay in the castle of Querrieu. He remained there until his promotion to command of the 5th British Army.

After the death, without lineage on April 17, 1878, of Raoul de Gaudechart last marquess of Querrieu, the castle became property of Marie-Thérèse de Gaudechart direct descendant of Robert de Gaudechart seignior of Querrieu, wife of the count Alvar d'Alcantara, of Belgian nobility.

In 1927, the name of Querrieu was added to those of d'Alcantara. Nowadays, the castle is still inhabited by the family d'Alcantara de Querrieu.

=== Church ===
The church is dedicated to Saint Gervais and Saint Protais.

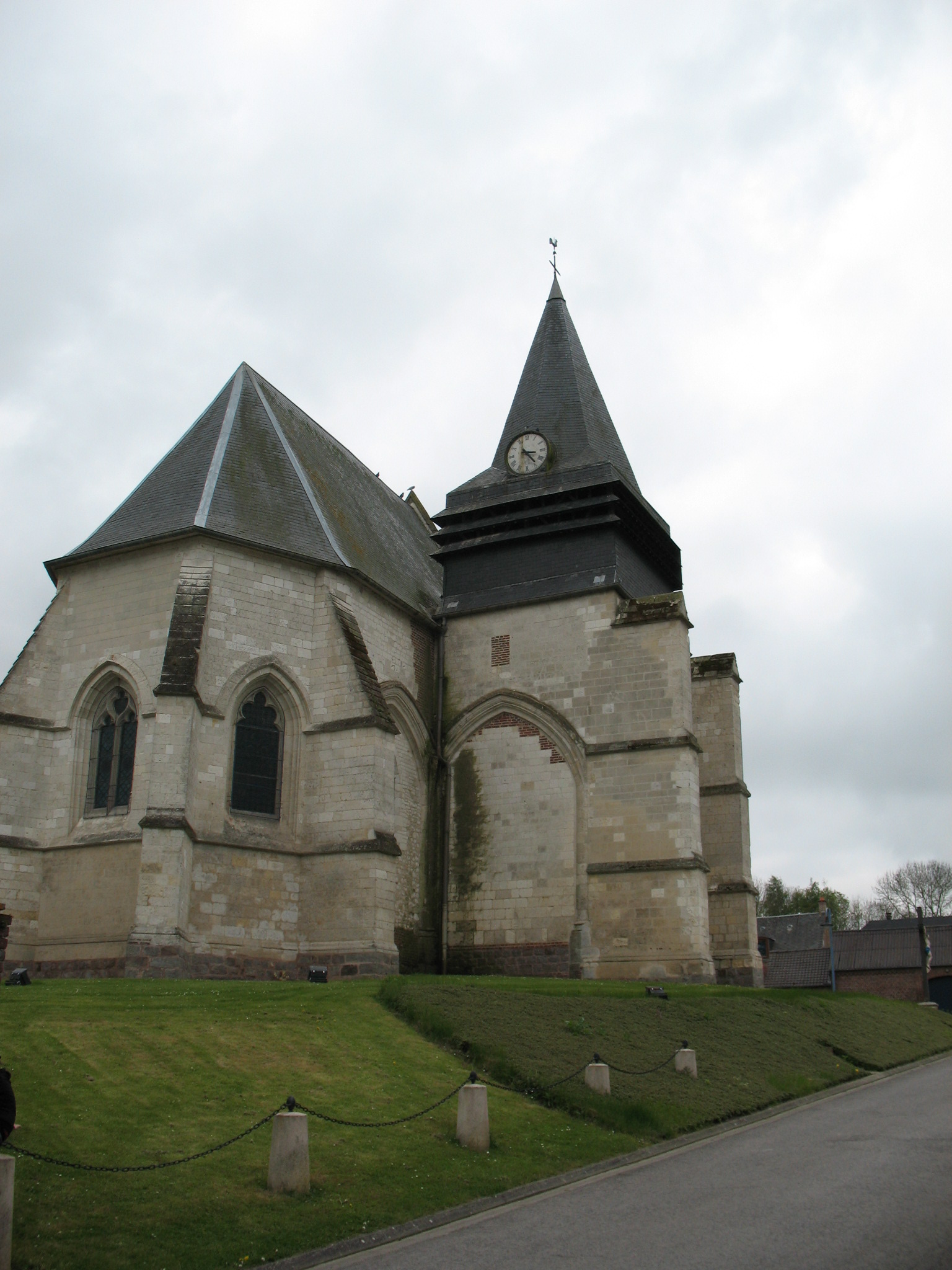
Querrieu church

==== Architecture ====
The church of Querrieu bordering a chalky table-land, is looking down upon the Hallue river. It appears of heterogeneous construction, but the careful scrutiny of its architecture, is able to gives us its dates of modification.

The choir is bordered on each side by three columns without any capital and joined together by nibs of prismatic profile. Columns and walls sustain a frame hidden by a wooden ceiling. The apse is opened by large bays of Gothic style. The geminate central one represents Jesus the Saviour IHS. From an ancient transept, only one of the two arms on the north side subsists, used as a strong bell tower, from which the walls are pierced with ogival bays. Thus, this part of the church may be dated of the fourteenth or the fifteenth century.

The altar coming from the Abbey of Saint-Acheul of Amiens, was bought in 1805. Altar, steps and tabernacle made of painted oak, form a harmonious whole.

A Beam of Glory, modest reduction of a rood screen, was marking a separation between the choir and the nave. Two holes in pillars sustaining the high ogival Triumpal arch, are nowadays the only memory of that beam.

All bays are fitted with coloured stained glass. Their tints are green and gold on the geminate bay of the apse and the large one over the portal, red and blue prevail on all the others.

The simple observation of the joining of the choir with the nave and the bell tower, clearly marks the posteriority of the nave building. This construction without any architectural style is mainly characterised by its strength. Its eight pillars surmounted by heavy walls sustain the roof-tree by four beams and middle posts.

The octagonal base of the baptismal font, the column and the vat are made of limestone and may be dated of the sixteenth century. The cap on neo-gothic style, made of oak with sunken decorations, is dated of 1860.

The pulpit was offered in 1709. The internal face of the roof is decorated with the Holy Ghost dove.

==== Statuary ====
- Saint Gervais and Saint Protais, made of painted wood of the nineteenth century. Their bases are decorated with ornamental patterns.
- Saint Ambroise and Saint Augustin, made of painted wood of the eighteenth century.
- Saint Roch, made of painted wood, undated.
- The Blessed Virgin of the Calvary, made of painted wood of the sixteenth century. Probably coming from the Beam of Glory.
- Virgin of Mercy (Pietà). Monument made of painted chalk, undated.
- Virgin with infant. Processional statue made of pine wood, of nineteenth century.
- Saint Firmin, made of painted wood, of nineteenth century.

=== French War Memorial ===
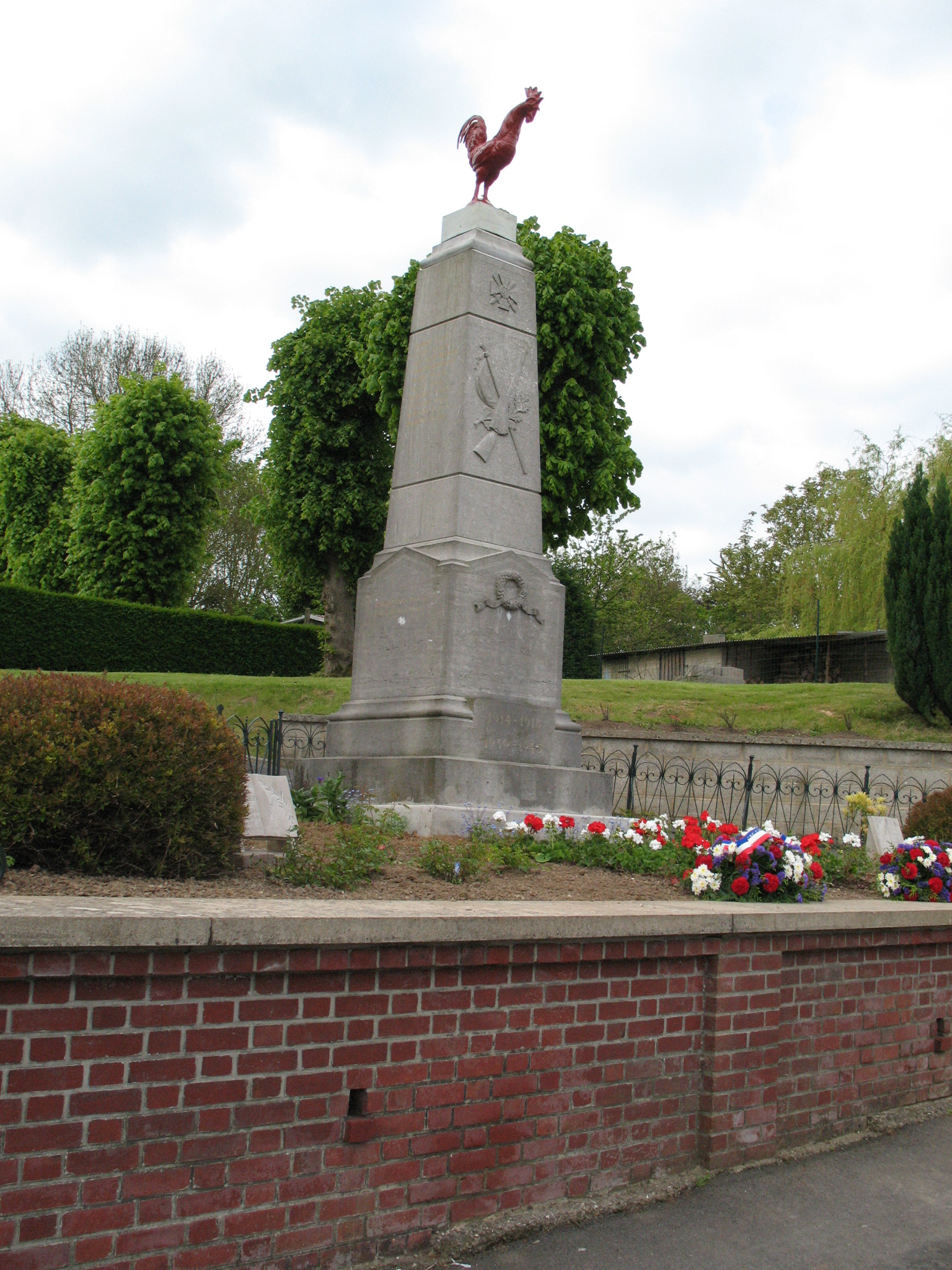
World War I : French Memorial

In 1921, a War Memorial was erected in front of the main square. Built in granite of Ardennes on truncated pyramidal shape of four metres high, it is surmounted by a gilded Gallic rooster.

== See also ==
- Communes of the Somme department
- Official History of Australia in the war 1914-1918, in Franco-Australian Museum of Villers-Bretonneux, Somme, France
