= Battle of Hallue =

Coordinates: 49.9408°N 2.4419°E

- Part of the Franco-Prussian War
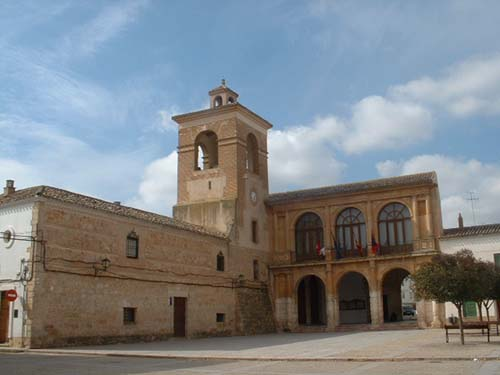
Date	23–24 December 1870
Location	north-east of Amiens, France
Result	Inconclusive

Belligerents
North German Confederation: Prussia	French Republic

Commanders and leaders
Edwin Freiherr von Manteuffel	Louis Faidherbe

Strength
22,500 soldiers	40,000 soldiers

Casualties and losses
996 soldiers killed and wounded	Over 1,000 soldiers killed 1,300 soldiers captured

The Battle of Hallue was a battle of the Franco-Prussian War on 23 and 24 December 1870.

The battle was fought between 40,000 French under General Louis Faidherbe and 22,500 Prussian troops under Edwin Freiherr von Manteuffel. The French lost heavily in the village lying in front of their position. However, the Prussians were unable to carry the entrenchments on the heights. After the attack was repulsed, the French assumed the offensive, but with no decisive result. One thousand French soldiers were killed, and 1,300 were imprisoned. About 927 German troops were killed and wounded.

== French Northern Army ==
After the fall of Amiens on 27 November 1870 and its occupation by the Prussian Army, the French Northern Army fell back towards Doullens and Bapaume to build up its strength again. It received a fresh supply of troops, allowing it to turn out three divisions.

General Faidherbe, lately entrusted with the command of this army, at once gave guiding rules and orders. He sent General Lecointe towards Saint-Quentin with the mission to act on the Haute Somme. Four battalions, including one of light-infantry and a battery of 4, succeeded, on 9 December, in taking possession of Ham and its fortress. Faidherbe, coming on the place, gave the order to withdraw and go towards Amiens.

On 17 December the Northern Army, regrouped, came settling to the Hallue valley from Bavelincourt to Daours. The troops (about 43,000 men) were divided into two army corps:

- The 22nd, with two divisions commanded by Major-General Derroja and Major-General Du Dessol
- The 23rd, with also two divisions commanded by Rear-Admiral Moulac and Major-General Robin

These troops were billeted in all the villages of the valley and outposts settled on a line passing through the woods of Saint-Gratien, Allonville and Querrieu (La Gorgue).

=== French Army tactical positions on 19 December ===
- The 1st Division occupied Vadencourt, Bavelincourt, Beaucourt and Béhencourt, keeping up the road to Arras.
- The 2nd Division kept Querrieu, Pont-Noyelles, Bussy, Daours and Vecquemont.
- The 3rd Division was in reserve; its 1st Brigade kept watch over the Somme River, on Corbie and Fouilloy and detached a regiment on Lahoussoye.
- The 4th Division in the making up, was put up around Corbie.
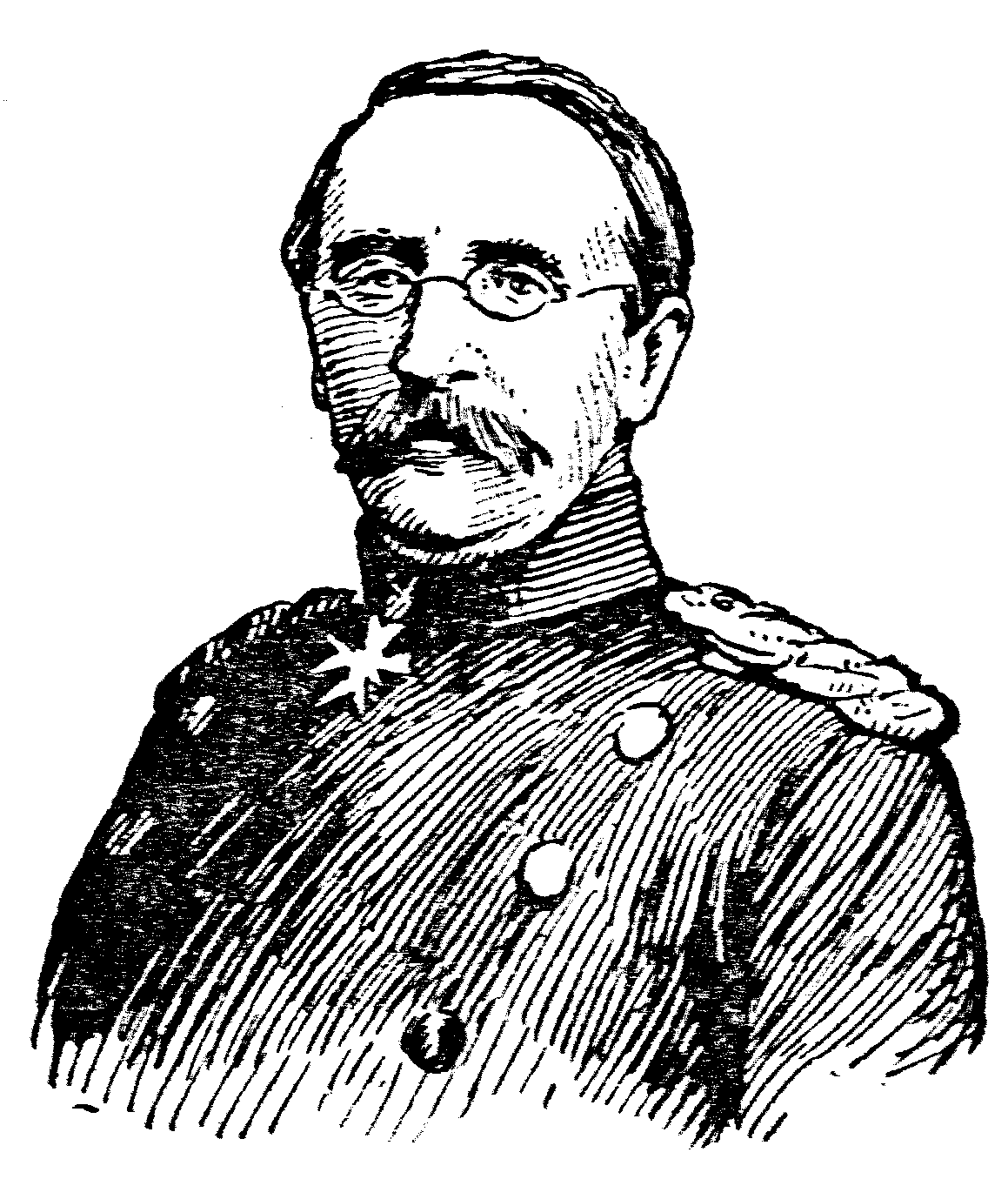
General von Goeben

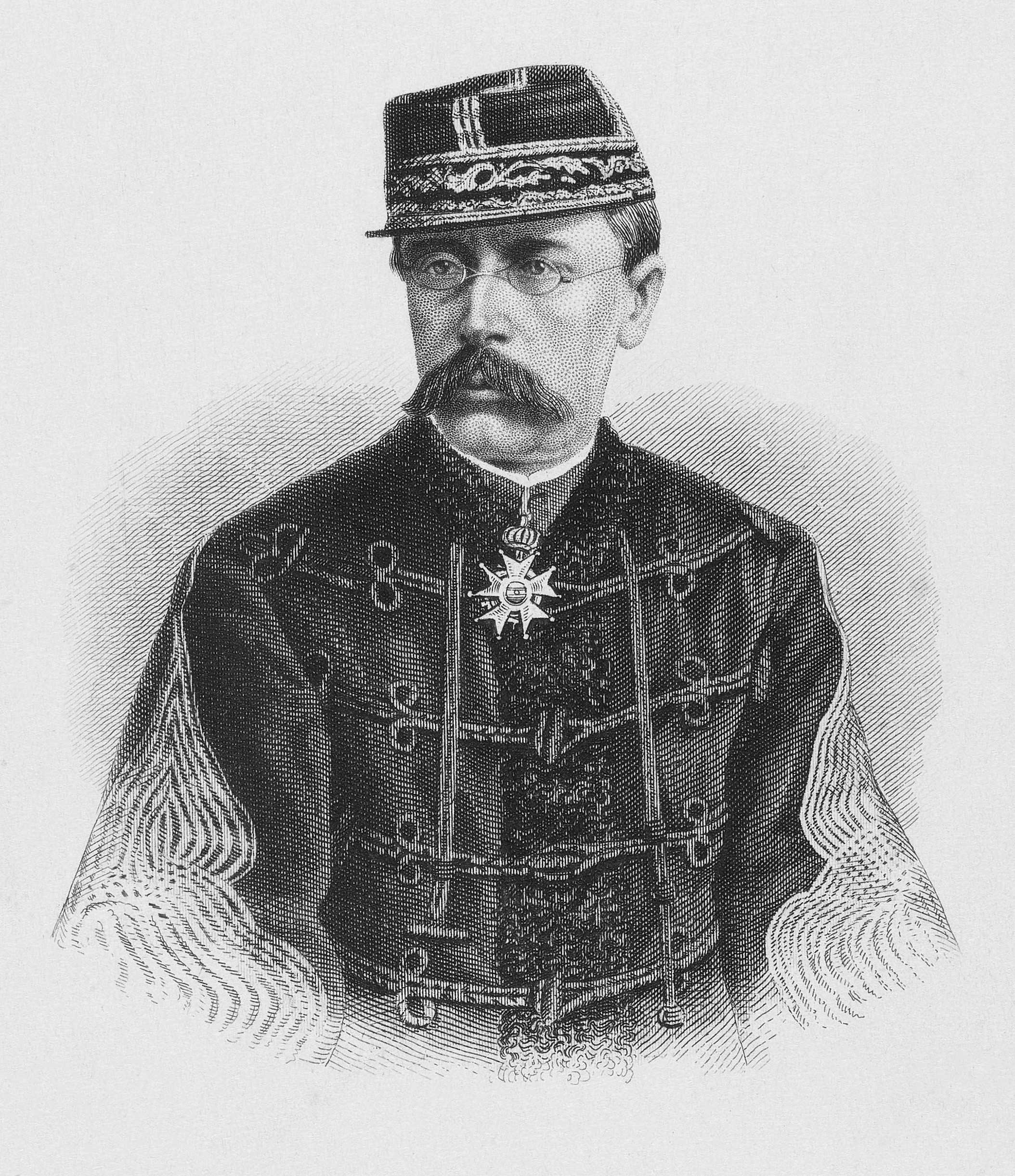
General Faidherbe, portrait 1860

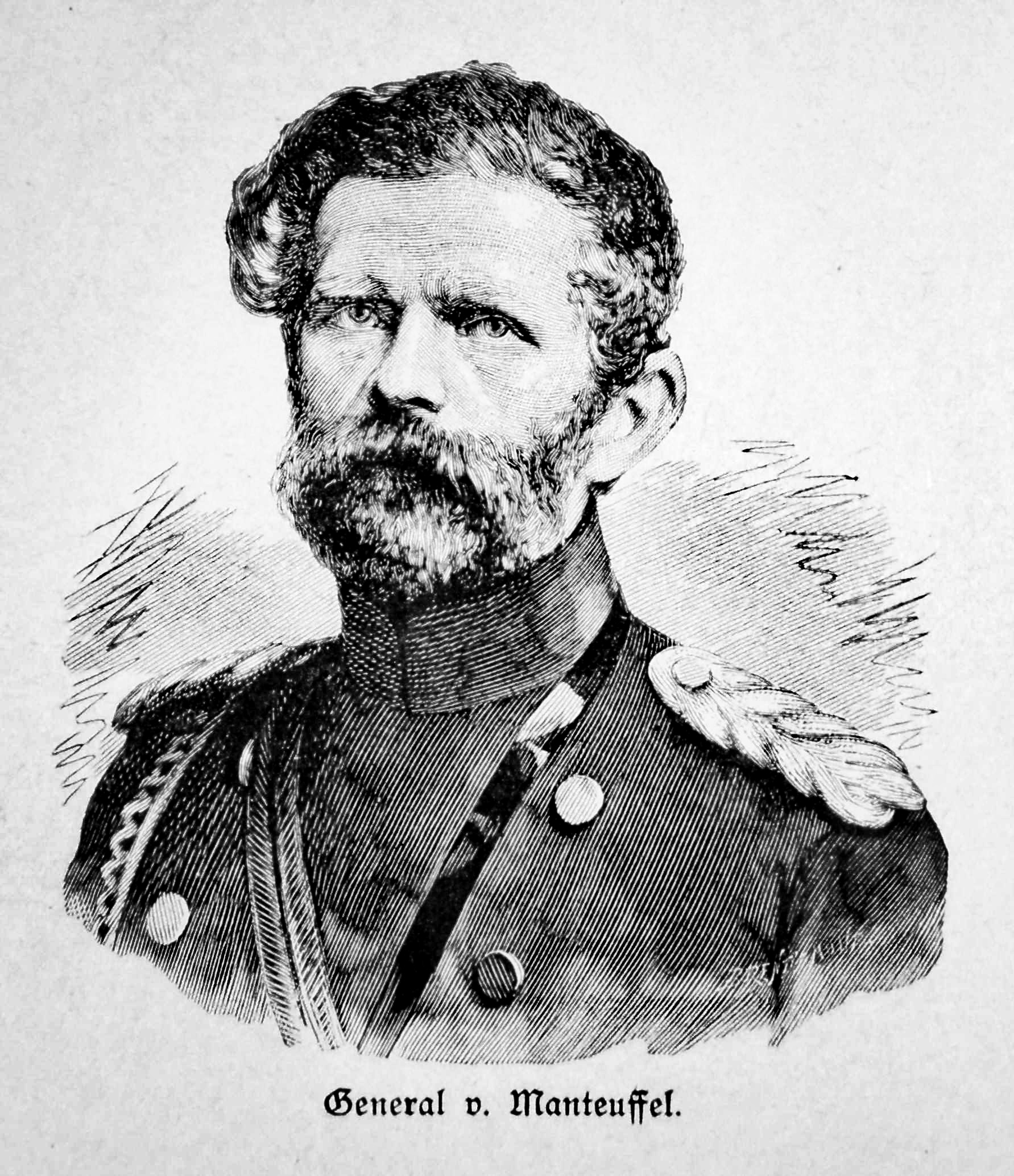
General von Manteuffel

== Prussian Army ==
At the same time, General von der Goeben, chief commander of the 8th Prussian Corps, set:

- The 32nd Brigade (General De Rex) into Amiens.
- The 31st Brigade was just arriving on Sains and the field-artillery was on Ailly-sur-Noye.
- The 15th Infantry Division (General Kummer) was along the La Luce river.
- The cavalry (Lieutenant-General Graf von der Gröben) was on flank-guard from Rosières to Chaulnes.

== Skirmish on Querrieu, 20 December ==
General-Major von Mirus in command of the 6th Cavalry Brigade staying in Amiens for two days, sent a strong reconnaissance party consisting of a cavalry troop, an infantry battalion and a field artillery battery, to Querrieu village.

Reaching the La Gorgue wood skirt, the party knocked against a French outpost and, sustained by its artillery, joined a lengthy battle.

Two French battalions strenuously fought back, so much that General Du Dessol launched three companies coming from Bussy-lès-Daours to the right flank of the enemy, who is constrained to a withdrawal towards the Alençons farm, then to Amiens.

In this battle the Prussians lost 3 officers and 69 men killed or wounded; French casualties were 7 dead and 20 wounded.

== Battle on the Hallue valley, 23 December ==
Succeeding to General Steinmetz, General Manteuffel, recently appointed at the head of the 1st Prussian Army, arrived in Amiens on 22 December and gave the offensive order for the next day at 8 a.m.:

- The 15th Division must attack straight to the river, following an axle materialized by the Albert and Corbie roads.
- The 16th Division, by the roads in the north of Arras road, must outflank the right wing of French troops.
- An infantry brigade is kept in reserve.
- Part of the cavalry division must carry out the touch between the 15th and the 16th Divisions.
- Fresh supplies of troops, shall be launched in the battle as soon as their arrival.

French dispositions remain unchanged.

The battle is going to stretch out across a front line of 12 kilometres (7.5 mi) wide and 4–5 kilometres (2.5–3.1 mi)s deep, on snow-covered ground and an icy temperature increased by a wind blowing from the north.

=== Arms ===
==== Guns ====
The French used the Chassepot model 1866, breech-loading gun, with paper cartridges and 11mm bullets.

The Prussians used the Dreize created in 1848, breech-loading gun, with paper cartridges and 15mm bullets.

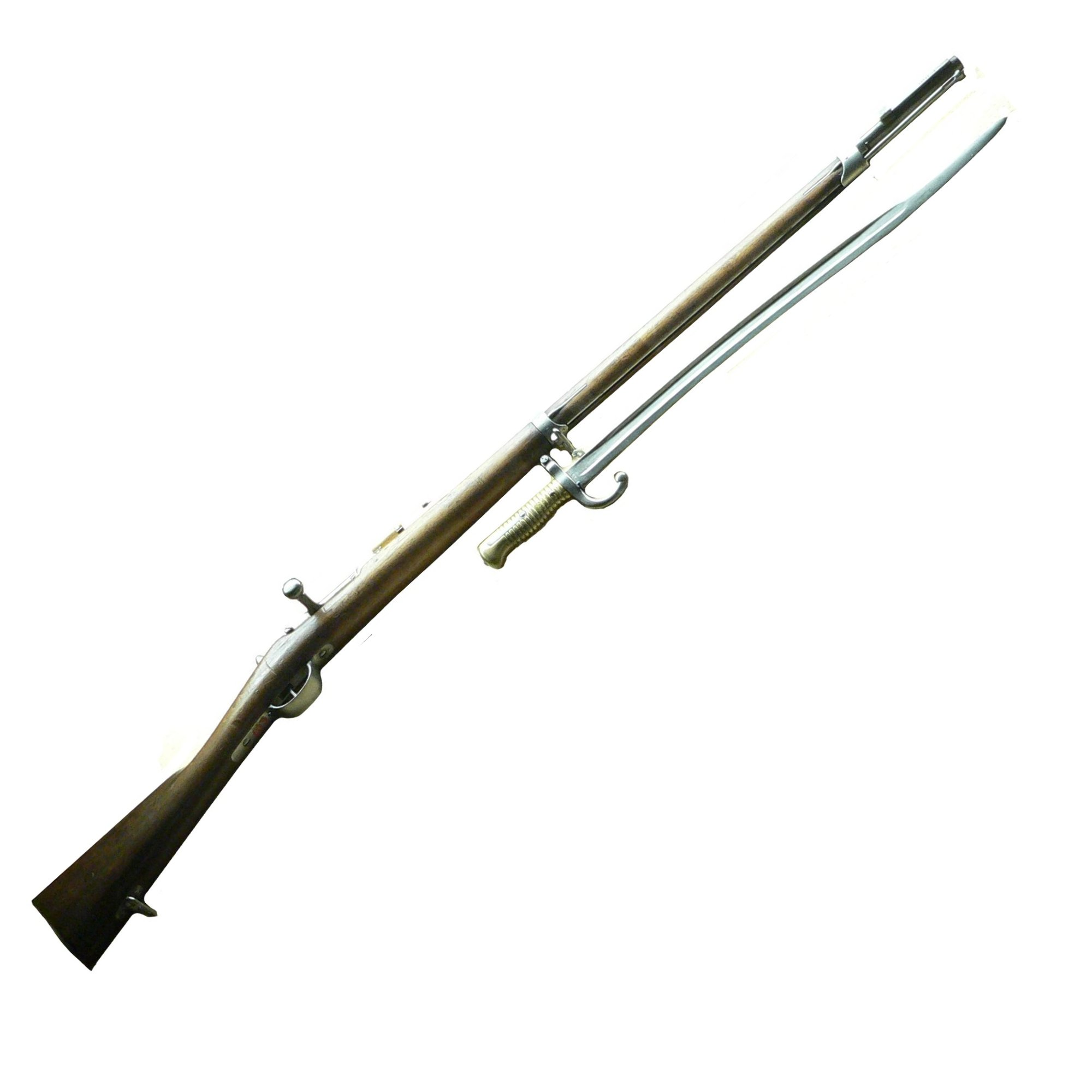
Chassepot rifle, model 1866

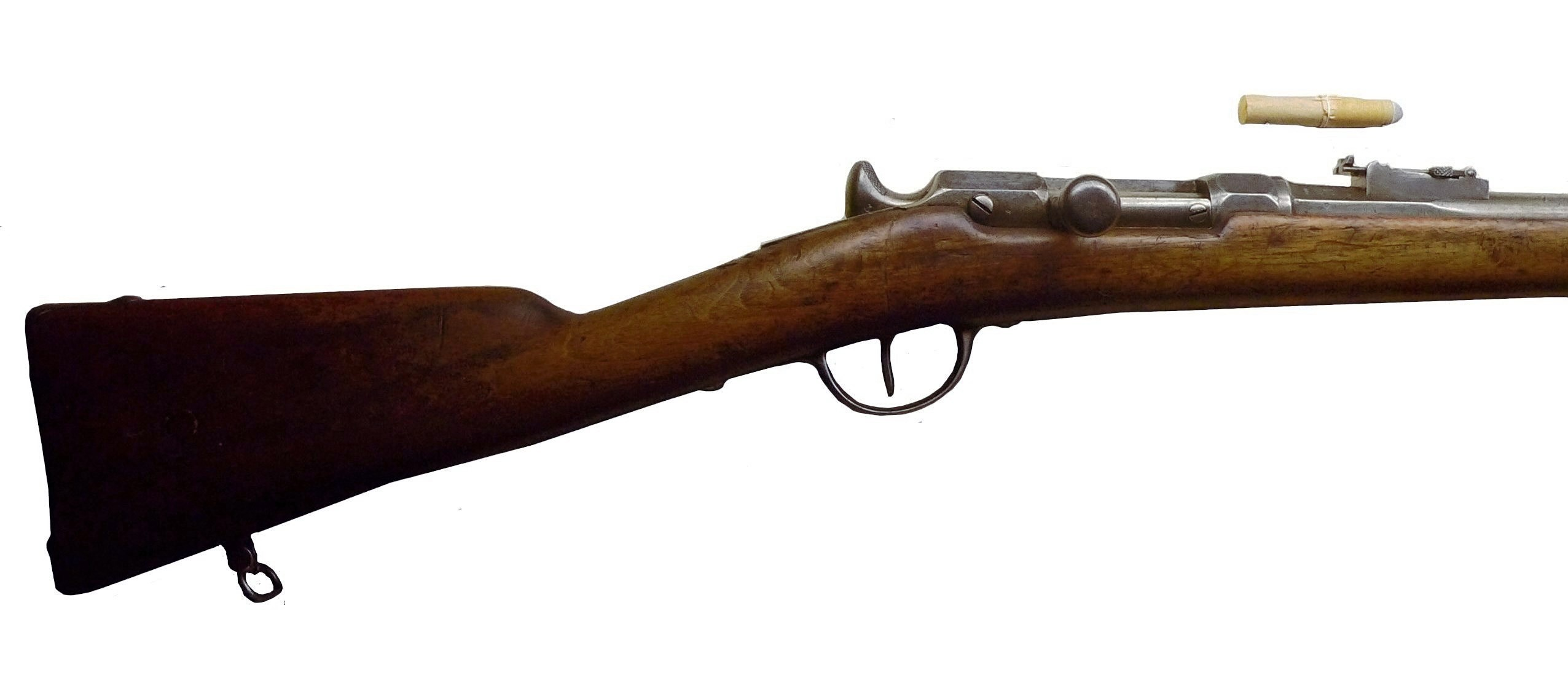
Chassepot: details of breech and ammunition

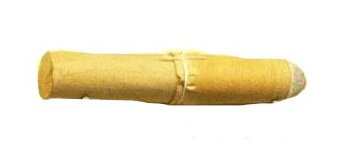
detail of the ammunition

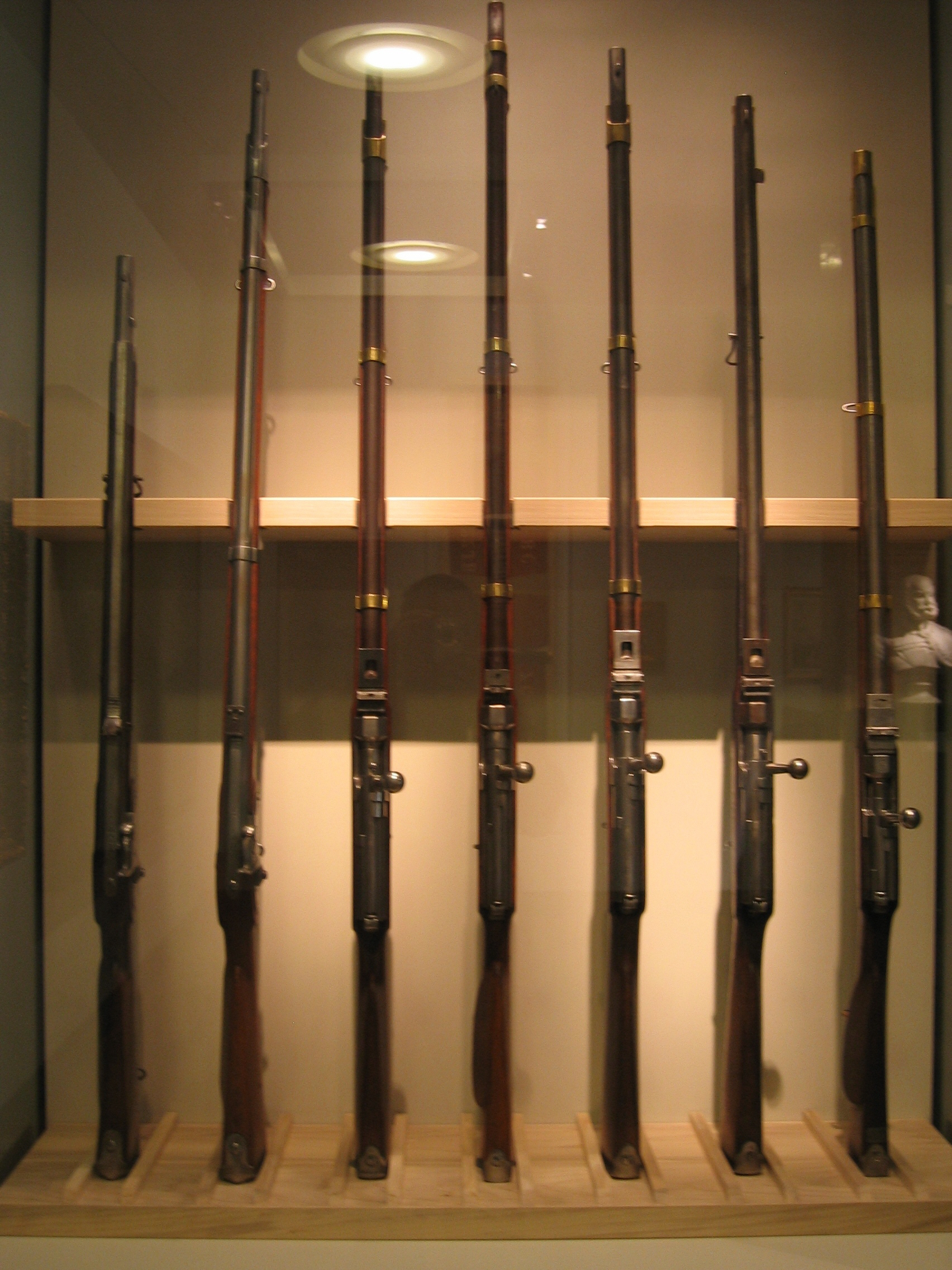
Dreyse rifles: the 3rd from the left is the first of the series (1847)

==== Cannons ====
The French used cannons made in bronze dating from the Napoleonic period, loading from the muzzle, and iron inner-tubes ones, model 1858. They also use canons à balles (machine-guns) able to project 25 bullets.

The Prussians used Krupp breech-loading cannons and shrapnel shells.

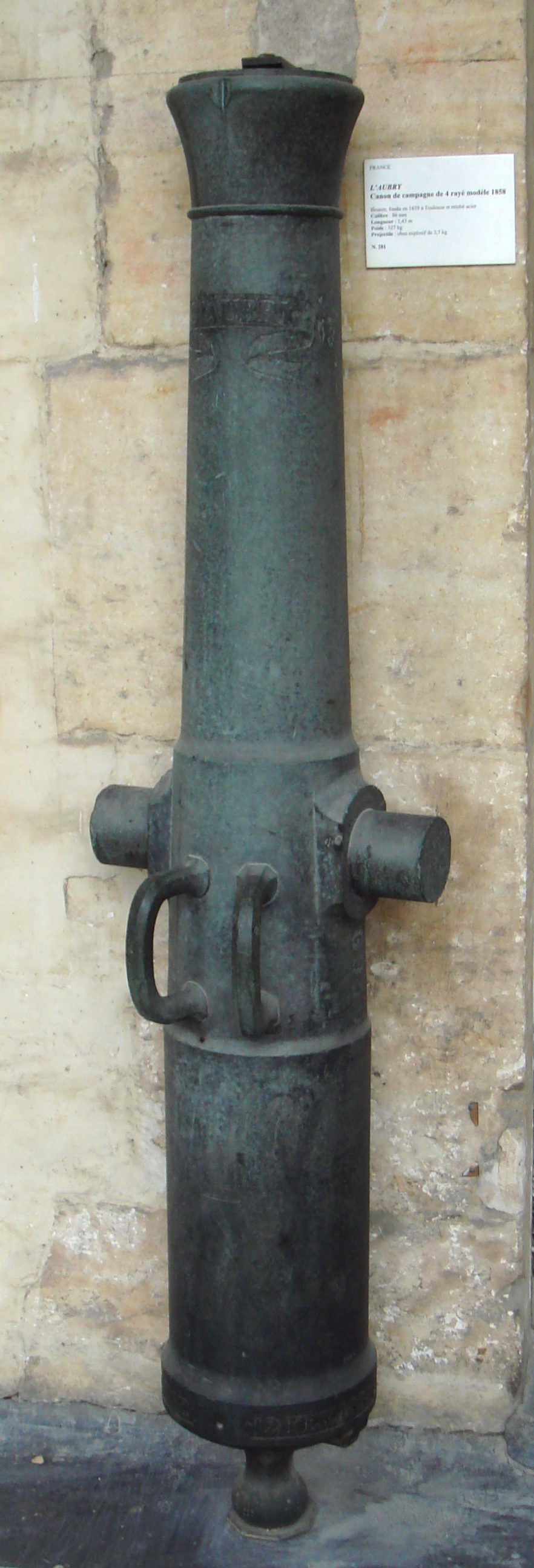
French inner tube cannon, model 1858

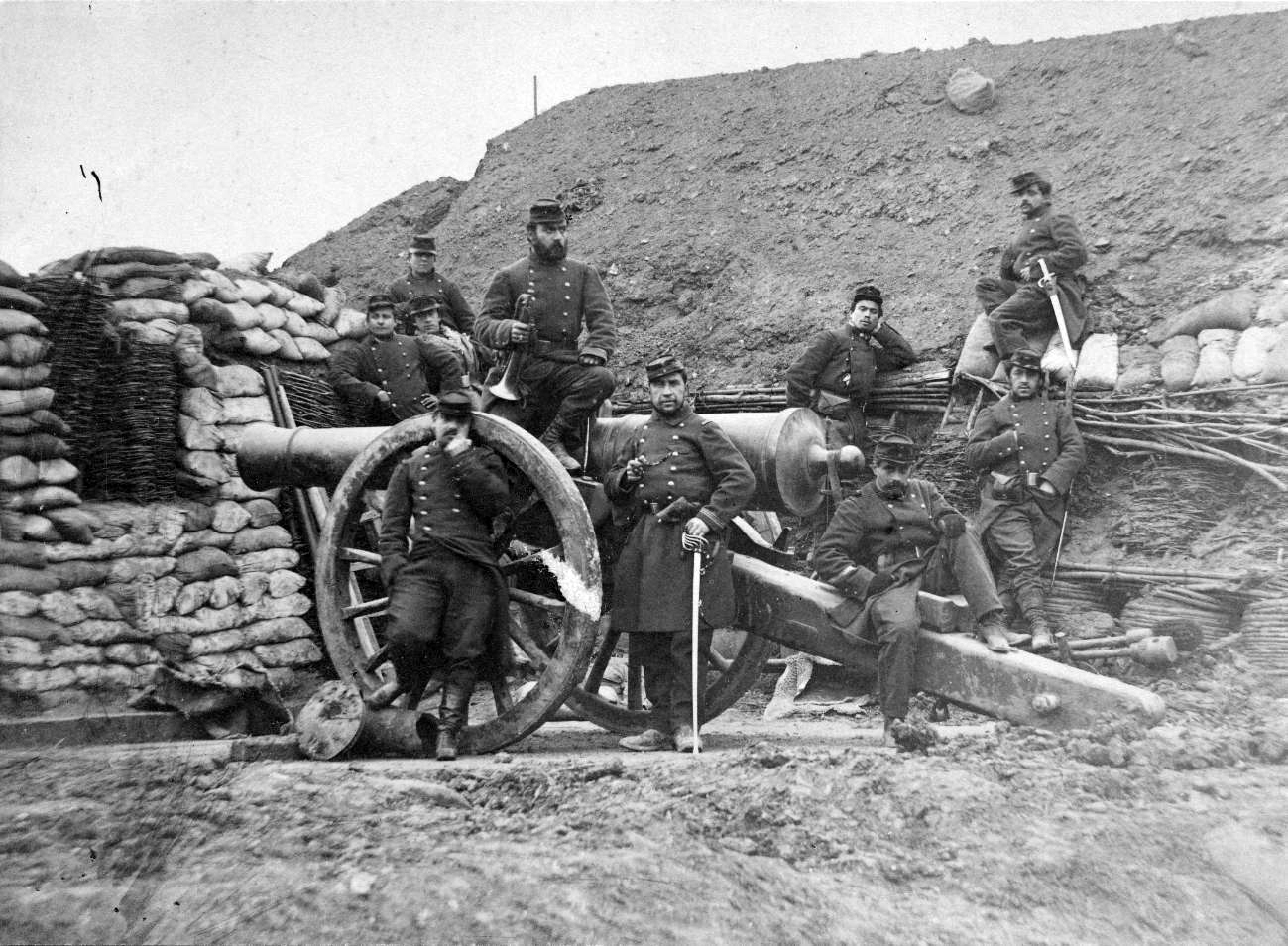
French gun in action

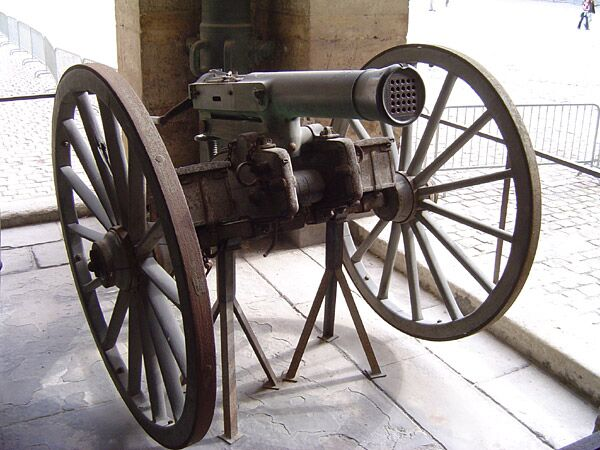
French canon à balles (machine gun)

=== Prussian offensive ===
The 8th Prussian Corps started on its way on 23 December at 8 a.m. The 15th Division received an order to reject French troops beyond the Hallue river, but not to venture on the left bank until the effect of an outflanking motion of the 16th Division, more on the north, would be felt. Therefore, the 15th Division moved towards Allonville, followed by three-horse field artillery and artillery corps, then turned to Querrieu. French outposts withdrew to the river, giving the alarm to the troops located in the back.

- At about 11 a.m. the 29th Prussian Brigade (von Bock), accompanied by two hussar troops and two batteries, on the Albert road, ran against the French 18th light infantry battalion taking up Querrieu with the supply of three batteries.
- Two Prussian batteries, soon reinforced by the other two, were placed in the south of Albert road; they started firing, and a particularly violent duel was launched. After an hour of firing, the Prussians took possession of Querrieu. The fight went on in Pont-Noyelles, vigorously defended by the 18th battalion of light infantry and two battalions of the 70th infantry regiment. Received by a nourished fire started by some units of the Gislain Brigade, posted on the left side of the river, Prussians were stopped on the east of the village.
- At the same time, more in the south, the 20th light infantry battalion of the Foester Brigade, keeping up the Bussy-lès-Daours village, was attacked on a concentric action from a battalion coming from the north, two companies and a hussar troop coming from the east. About 1 p.m. the French evacuated the village. In the afternoon, in the west of a line Querrieu-Bussy, 42 Prussian cannons were set over against the same number of French cannons posted on the left side of the river.
- Then, in possession of Bussy-lès-Daours, the Prussians moved forwards to Vecquemont and launched a vigorous attack; they came up to the 19th light infantry battalion and marines of Captain Payen Brigade, sustained on their right by the Foester Brigade. Under a hail of bullets, the Prussians were unable to progress. Manteuffel himself came onto the heights above Querrieu on the west, asked for artillery fresh supplies, which arrived at about 4 p.m. The French Payen Brigade was constrained to evacuate Vecquemont and held a position on the left side of the river.
- In Pont-Noyelles, at about 3:30 p.m. the Prussians tried to climb the hills on the east of the river, but after a counter-attack conducted by a 70th regiment battalion and a company of the 101st mobile commanded by Captain d'Hauterive, bayonet charging, the French again took the village, but they were unable to keep it up.
- Far in the north, the Prussian 30th Brigade successfully attacked Fréchencourt; they were stopped by the fire guns of the 18th light infantry battalion and a battalion of mobiles coming down from Parmont wood. The Du Dressol Division held the heights.
- On the north of Fréchencourt, the 16th Prussian Division (von Barnekow) came from Amiens on the Doullens road to Poulainville and Rainneville without seeing anyone all along the morning. At 1 p.m. General von Goeben sent an order to Barnekow to turn to the right. Barnekow made his way to Beaucourt-sur-l'Hallue and Saint-Gratien.
- Passing beyond Saint-Gratien, the 31st Prussian Brigade (von Gneissnau) received an order to reach Montigny-sur-l'Hallue. At about 3 p.m. the Prussians brought into action with the 2nd French Brigade (Pittié) of the Derroja Division; after the fall of Montigny, they pushed the French back towards Béhencourt, who, in their withdrawal, destroyed the Hallue bridges, but the Prussians, under strong fire, launched a foot-bridge over the river.
- With fresh supplies coming from the 32nd Brigade (von Rex), the Prussians took possession of Beaucourt, Montigny, Béhencourt, and Bavelincourt while their artillery (six batteries) took up position on the north of Fréchencourt. This artillery cannonade was without any success, the French artillery was on a higher position on Parmont wood and too far away.

=== Battle in the dusk ===
At 4 pm, night was about to fall. The Prussians keep under control the right side of the river and Pont-Noyelles village. Their turning movement on the north had failed and their troops were threatened by the Aynes Brigade of the Derroja Division, coming into sight on the south-east of Contay, marching to Beaucourt. At that time, General Faidherbe gave the attack order on all the front line. This attack continued from 4 to 6 p.m.:

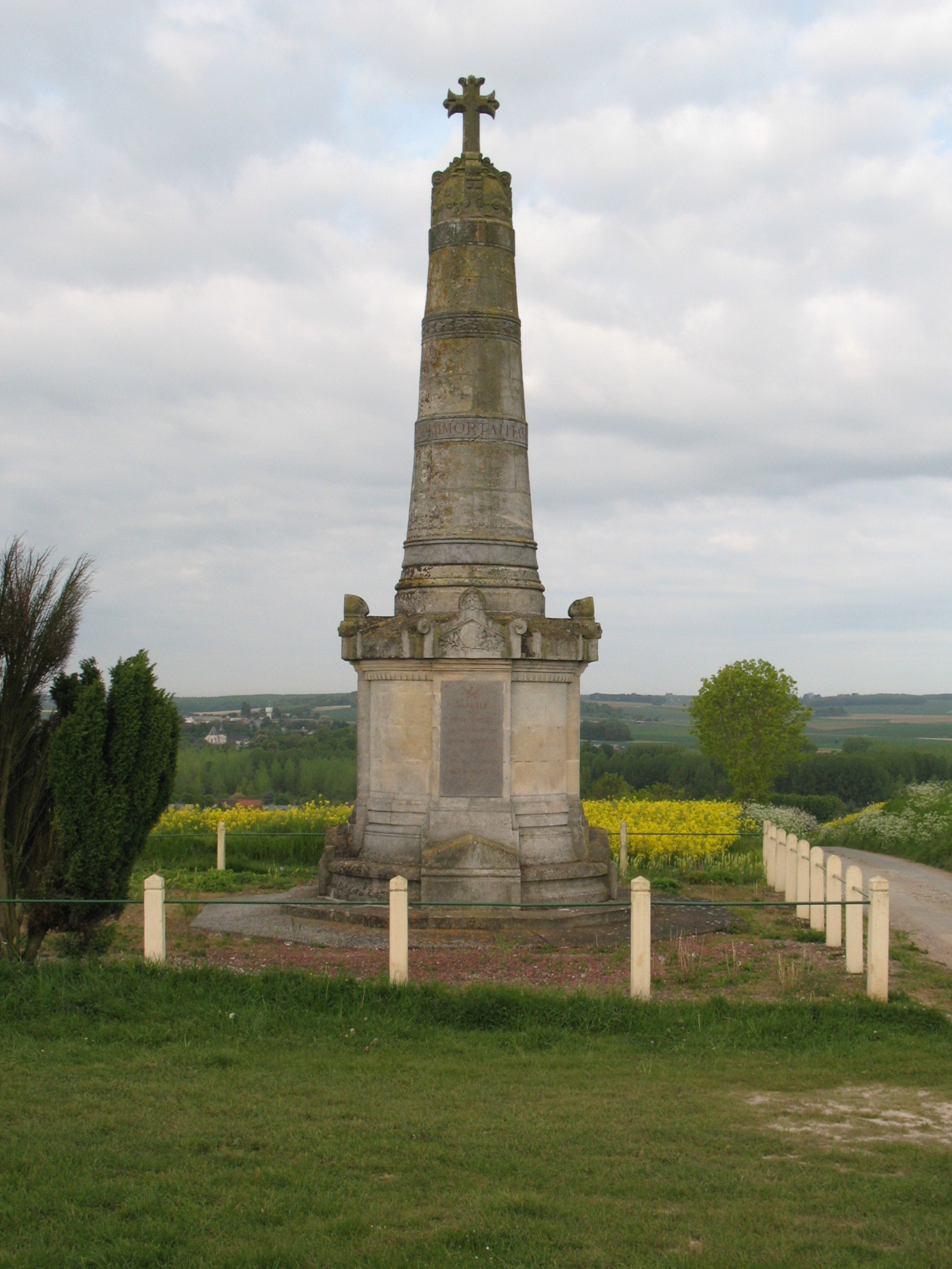
Colonne Faidherbe memorial

- In the center, General Lecointe, having assembled all troops still organized, launched an offensive on Pont-Noyelles. Two successive attacks went ahead, but his troops, the 18th light infantry battalion and the 70th infantry regiment, not accustomed to night combat, had to withdraw, all the more that Manteuffel had launched two battalions to sustain his troops.
- In the south, the Foester Brigade succeeded in crossing the river between Querrieu and Bussy, but it was stopped by the fresh supplies sent by Manteuffel. At about 5 p.m. the Payen Brigade launched an attack on Vecquemont but was stopped in its turn.
- At 7 p.m. the battlefield was in complete darkness. The Prussians held all the villages in the valley and billeted there. The French Army was obliged to bivouac on its positions, by night on the heights on the snowy ground, where the temperature fell to −8 °C (18 °F) and an icy wind was blowing without any obstacle.

=== Withdrawal movement ===
On the next day, 24 December at 9 am, the French artillery launched a cannonade to Béhencourt without any Prussian reply. General Faidherbe made up his mind to retreat. The withdrawal, protected by a line of retarding units, began at about 2 pm. The Prussians would only start the pursuit on the following day, 25 December. At that time, the French Army was arriving at Bapaume.

== Memorials ==
A war memorial named "Colonne Faidherbe" was erected in 1875, on the heights of Pont-Noyelles, on the place where General Faidherbe directed the last combats.

An ossuary contains the bodies of 74 soldiers killed during the battle in and around Pont-Noyelles.

In every village of the valley, many soldiers' bodies lie in their communal cemeteries.

In the Querrieu communal cemetery, a military grave surmounted by a stele and a cavalry, erected in 1875, contains the bodies of 12 unknown French soldiers. Another grave, also surmounted by a stele, contains the bodies of 18 Prussian soldiers; only the name of one of them is known.

== Notes ==
- George Bruce. Harbottle's Dictionary of Battles. (Van Nostrand Reinhold, 1981) (ISBN 0-442-22336-6).
