= Pont-Noyelles =

- Commune
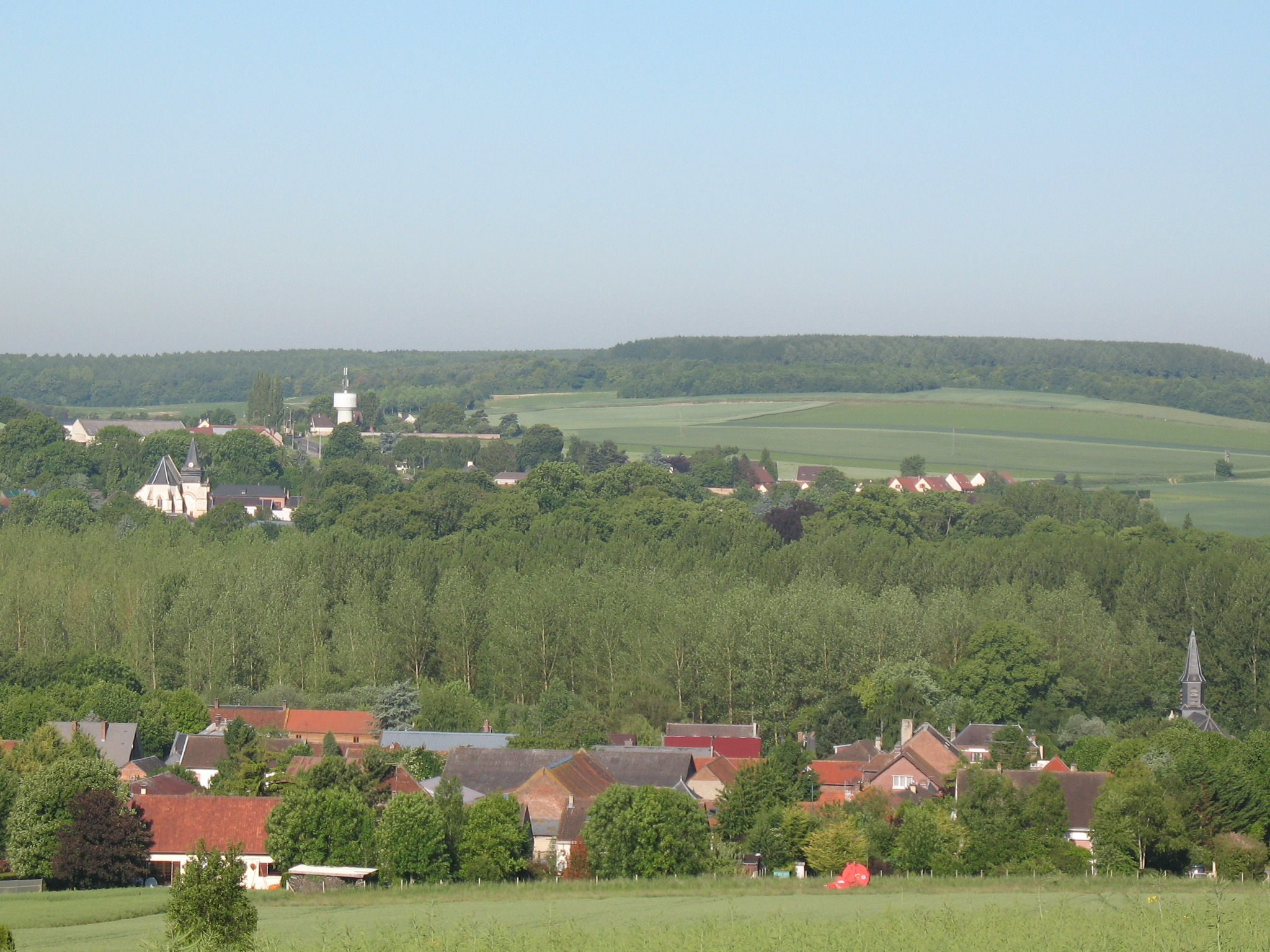
- A general view of Pont-Noyelles

- Coat of arms
- Location of Pont-Noyelles
- Location within France Location within Hauts-de-France
- Coordinates: 49°56′27″N 2°26′31″E
- Country: France
- Region: Hauts-de-France
- Department: Somme
- Arrondissement: Amiens
- Canton: Corbie
- Intercommunality: CC Val de Somme

Government
  - Mayor (2020–2026): Jacky Durier
- Area^{1}: 8.62 km^{2} (3.33 sq mi)
- Elevation: 60 m (200 ft)
- Highest elevation: 123 m (404 ft)
- Lowest elevation: 32 m (105 ft)
- Population (2023): 826
  - Density: 95.8/km^{2} (248/sq mi)
- Time zone: UTC+01:00 (CET)
  - Summer (DST): UTC+02:00 (CEST)
- INSEE/Postal code: 80634 /80115
- ^{1} French Land Register data, which excludes lakes, ponds, glaciers > 1 km^{2} (0.386 sq mi or 247 acres) and river estuaries.

Pont-Noyelles (French pronunciation: [pɔ̃ nwajɛl]; Picard: Pont-Noéyelle) is a commune in the Somme department in Hauts-de-France in northern France.

== Geography ==
The commune is situated at the junction of the D929, D30 and D115 roads, some 8 miles (13 km) northeast of Amiens, in the valley of the small river Hallue.

== Population ==
Historical population
| Year | Pop. | ±% p.a. |
|---|---|---|
| 1968 | 326 | — |
| 1975 | 538 | +7.42% |
| 1982 | 715 | +4.15% |
| 1990 | 800 | +1.41% |
| 1999 | 789 | −0.15% |
| 2007 | 726 | −1.03% |
| 2012 | 781 | +1.47% |
| 2017 | 840 | +1.47% |
| 2023 | 826 | −0.28% |
Source: INSEE

== History ==
Pont-Noyelles was the scene of one of the battles of the Franco-Prussian War. On 23 and 24 December 1870, French troops, led by Colonel Louis Faidherbe routed German forces led by Edwin Freiherr von Manteuffel at the Battle of Hallue. A memorial at the site of the General's headquarters commemorates the battle.

== See also ==
- Communes of the Somme department
