= Bussy-lès-Daours =

- Commune
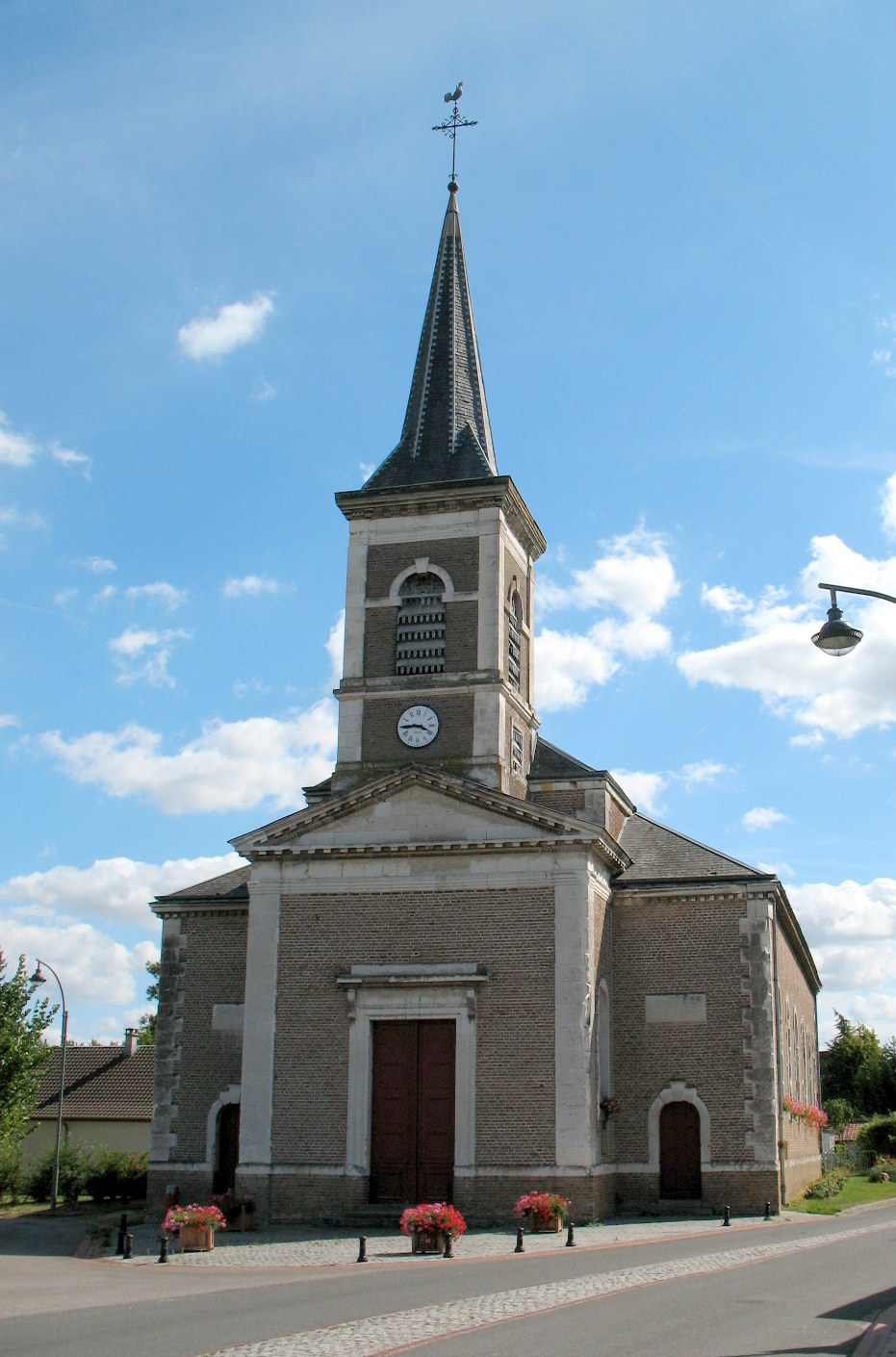
- The church of Bussy-lès-Daours
- Location of Bussy-lès-Daours
- Location within France Location within Hauts-de-France
- Coordinates: 49°54′39″N 2°25′59″E
- Country: France
- Region: Hauts-de-France
- Department: Somme
- Arrondissement: Amiens
- Canton: Amiens-3
- Intercommunality: Val de Somme

Government
  - Mayor (2020–2026): Sylvie Brandicourt
- Area^{1}: 8.1 km^{2} (3.1 sq mi)
- Elevation: 40 m (130 ft)
- Highest elevation: 86 m (282 ft)
- Lowest elevation: 31 m (102 ft)
- Population (2023): 370
  - Density: 46/km^{2} (120/sq mi)
- Time zone: UTC+01:00 (CET)
  - Summer (DST): UTC+02:00 (CEST)
- INSEE/Postal code: 80156 /80800
- ^{1} French Land Register data, which excludes lakes, ponds, glaciers > 1 km^{2} (0.386 sq mi or 247 acres) and river estuaries.

Bussy-lès-Daours (French pronunciation: [bysi lɛ duʁ], literally Bussy near Daours; Picard: Buchin-lès-Dour) is a commune in the Somme département in Hauts-de-France in northern France.

== Toponymy ==
Bussy-lès-Daours has been recorded as:

- Busci in 1153
- Buxeria in 1164
- Buscicum in 1170
- Buxis in 1301
- Buyssi in the 17th century

== Geography ==
The commune is situated on the D1e road, some 11 km (7 mi) northeast of Amiens.

== Population ==
Historical population
| Year | Pop. | ±% p.a. |
|---|---|---|
| 1968 | 189 | — |
| 1975 | 218 | +2.06% |
| 1982 | 278 | +3.53% |
| 1990 | 334 | +2.32% |
| 1999 | 325 | −0.30% |
| 2007 | 331 | +0.23% |
| 2012 | 345 | +0.83% |
| 2017 | 381 | +2.00% |
| 2023 | 370 | −0.49% |
Source: INSEE

== See also ==
- Communes of the Somme department
