= Fréchencourt =

- Commune
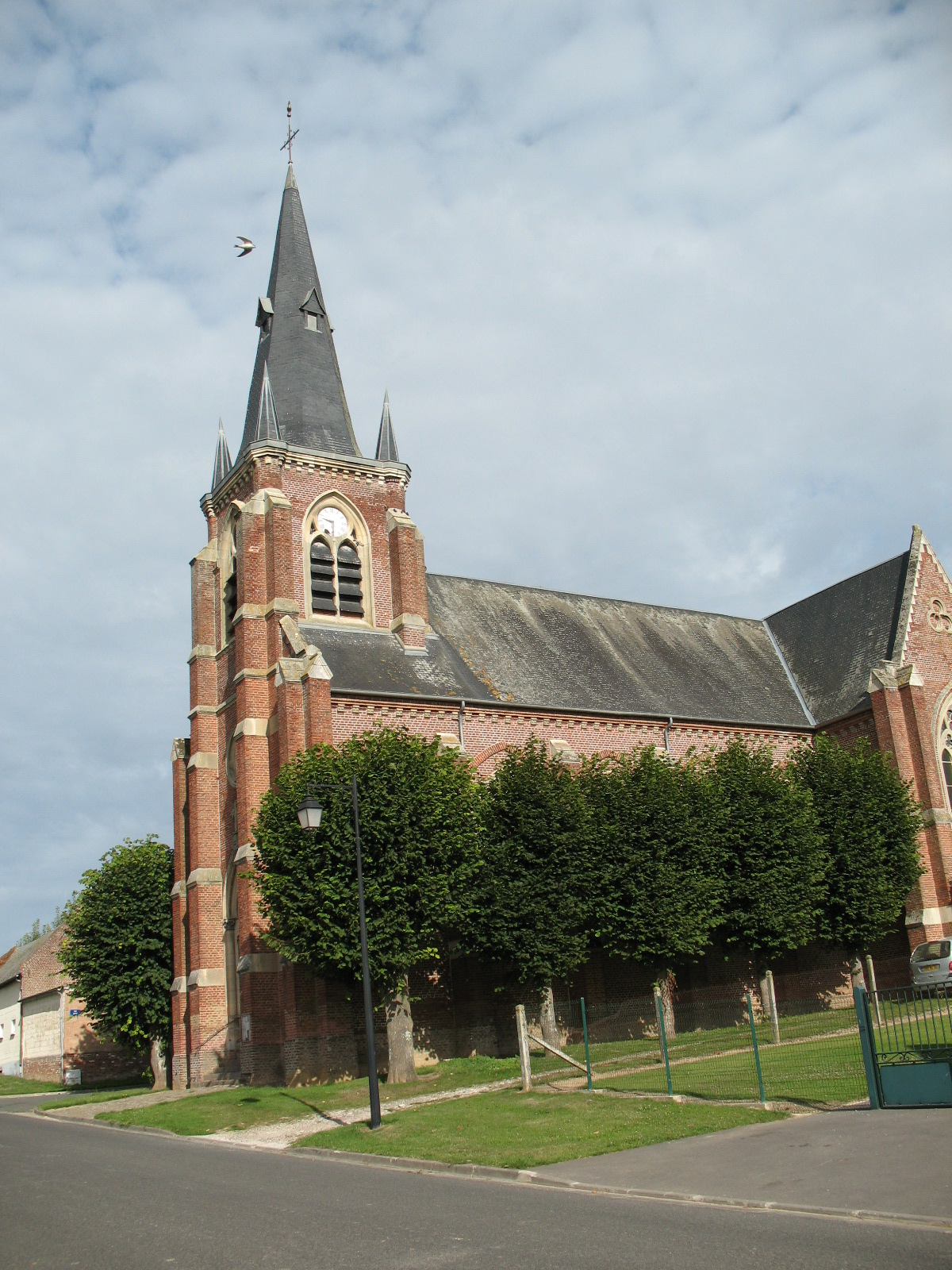
- The church in Fréchencourt

- Coat of arms
- Location of Fréchencourt
- Location within France Location within Hauts-de-France
- Coordinates: 49°57′59″N 2°26′32″E
- Country: France
- Region: Hauts-de-France
- Department: Somme
- Arrondissement: Amiens
- Canton: Corbie
- Intercommunality: CC Territoire Nord Picardie

Government
  - Mayor (2020–2026): Serge Wils
- Area^{1}: 5.59 km^{2} (2.16 sq mi)
- Elevation: 70 m (230 ft)
- Highest elevation: 116 m (381 ft)
- Lowest elevation: 37 m (121 ft)
- Population (2023): 250
  - Density: 45/km^{2} (120/sq mi)
- Time zone: UTC+01:00 (CET)
  - Summer (DST): UTC+02:00 (CEST)
- INSEE/Postal code: 80351 /80260
- ^{1} French Land Register data, which excludes lakes, ponds, glaciers > 1 km^{2} (0.386 sq mi or 247 acres) and river estuaries.

Fréchencourt (French pronunciation: [fʁeʃɑ̃kuʁ]) is a commune in the Somme department in Hauts-de-France in northern France.

== Geography ==
The commune is situated 8 miles (13 km) northeast of Amiens on the D115 road

== Population ==
Historical population
Year	Pop.	±% p.a.
1968	158	—
1975	165	+0.62%
1982	181	+1.33%
1990	233	+3.21%
1999	227	−0.29%
2007	229	+0.11%
2012	256	+2.25%
2017	263	+0.54%
2023	250	−0.84%
Source: INSEE

== See also ==
- Communes of the Somme department
