= Contay =

- Commune
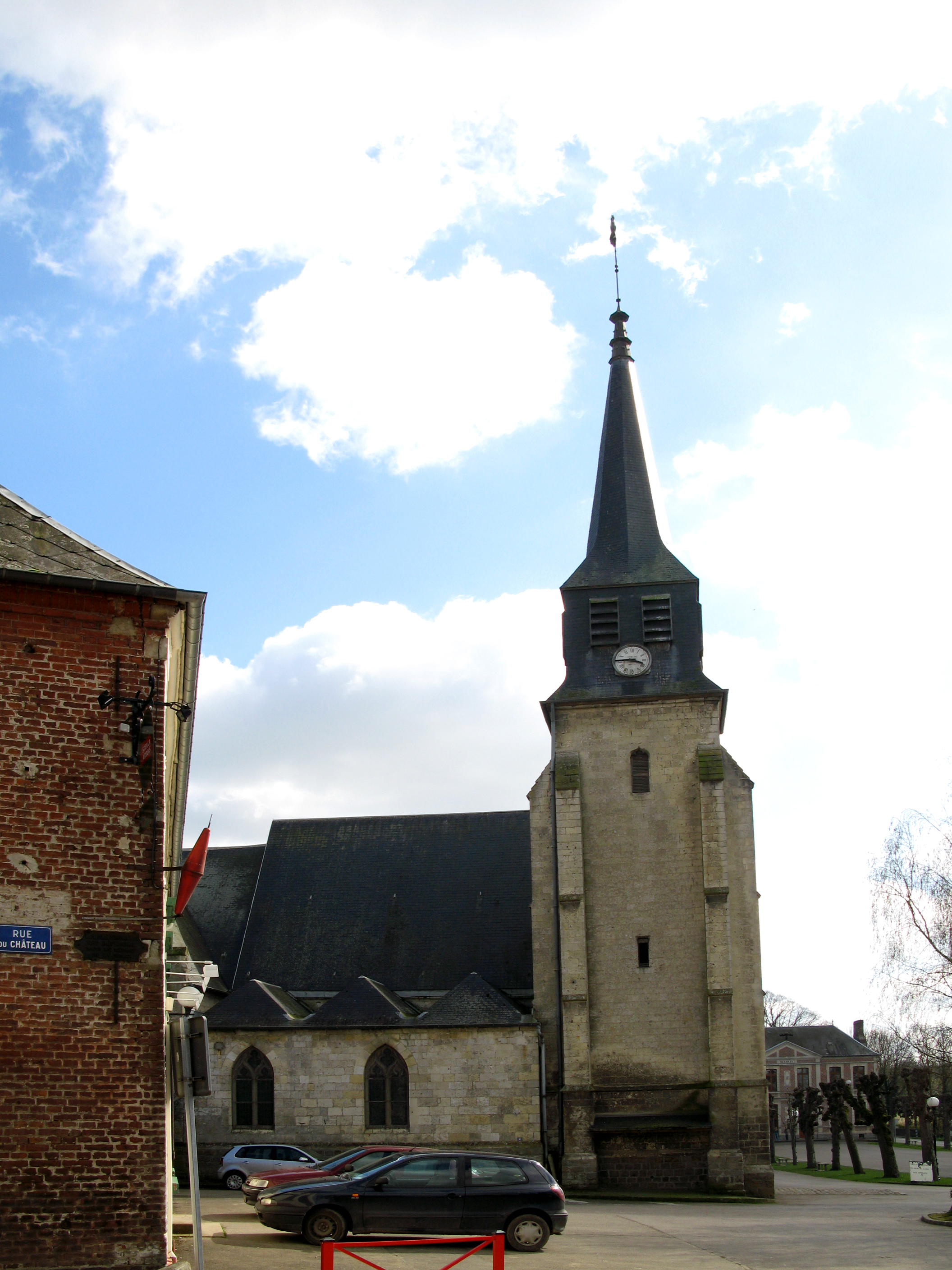
- The church in Contay

- Coat of arms
- Location of Contay
- Location within France Location within Hauts-de-France
- Coordinates: 50°00′19″N 2°28′38″E
- Country: France
- Region: Hauts-de-France
- Department: Somme
- Arrondissement: Amiens
- Canton: Corbie
- Intercommunality: CC Territoire Nord Picardie

Government
  - Mayor (2020–2026): Valerie Deneve
- Area^{1}: 8.41 km^{2} (3.25 sq mi)
- Elevation: 60 m (200 ft)
- Highest elevation: 133 m (436 ft)
- Lowest elevation: 47 m (154 ft)
- Population (2023): 305
  - Density: 36.3/km^{2} (93.9/sq mi)
- Time zone: UTC+01:00 (CET)
  - Summer (DST): UTC+02:00 (CEST)
- INSEE/Postal code: 80207 /80560
- ^{1} French Land Register data, which excludes lakes, ponds, glaciers > 1 km^{2} (0.386 sq mi or 247 acres) and river estuaries.

Contay (French pronunciation: [kɔ̃tɛ]) is a commune in the Somme department in Hauts-de-France in northern France.

== Geography ==
Contay is situated on the D23 and D919 crossroads, some 14 miles (23 km) northeast of Amiens, (Amiens to Arras)

== Population ==
Historical population
Year	Pop.	±% p.a.
1968	301	—
1975	285	−0.78%
1982	294	+0.45%
1990	333	+1.57%
1999	353	+0.65%
2007	373	+0.69%
2012	361	−0.65%
2017	364	+0.17%
2023	305	−2.90%
Source: INSEE

== See also ==
- Communes of the Somme department
