= Black & White (whisky) =

Scotch whisky( Blended Scotch Whisky)

- The label of Black & White, featuring a Scottie and a Westie

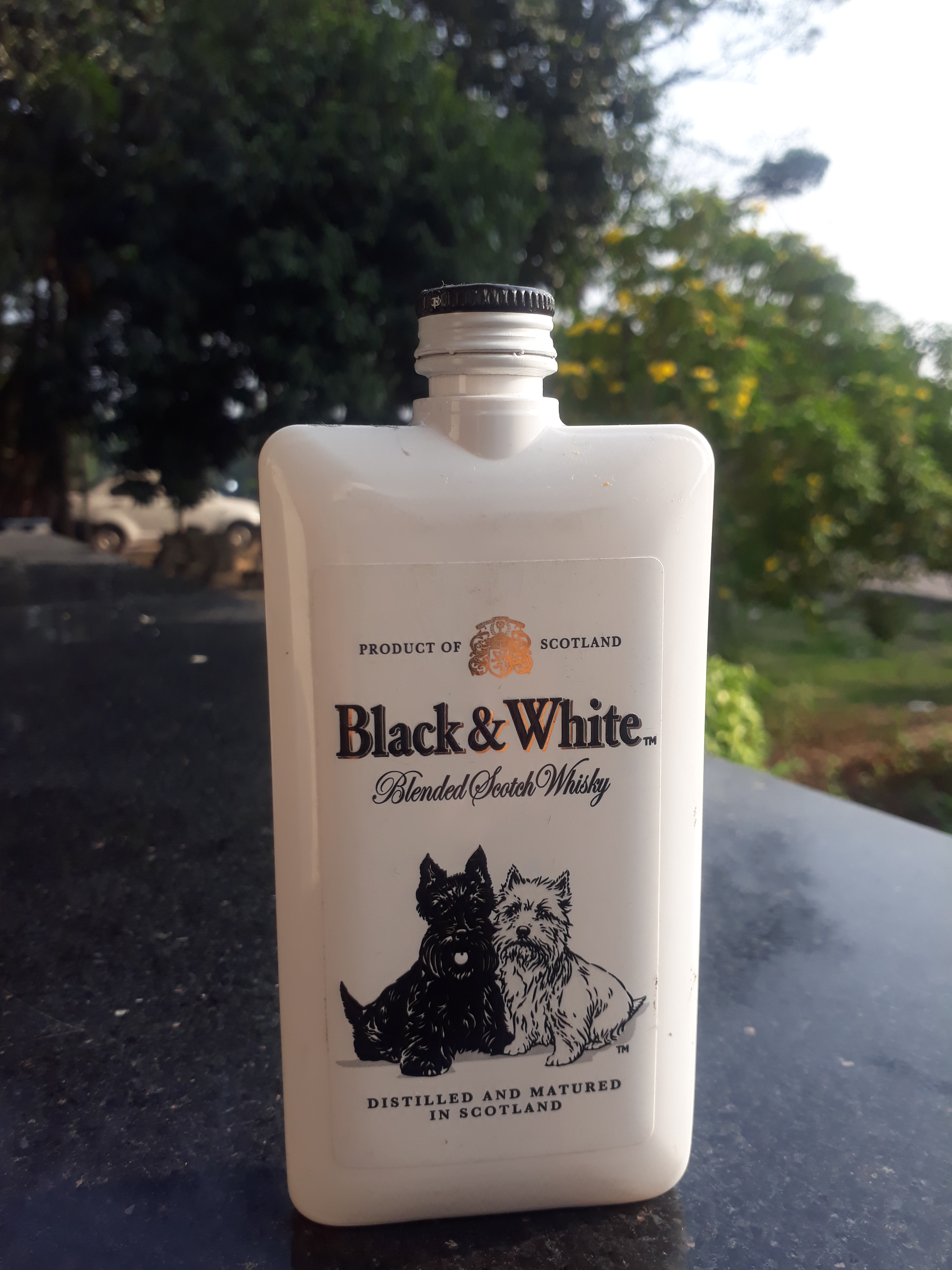
- Black & White bottle
- Type: Scotch whisky
- Manufacturer: Diageo
- Origin: Scotland
- Introduced: 1879
- Alcohol by volume: 40%

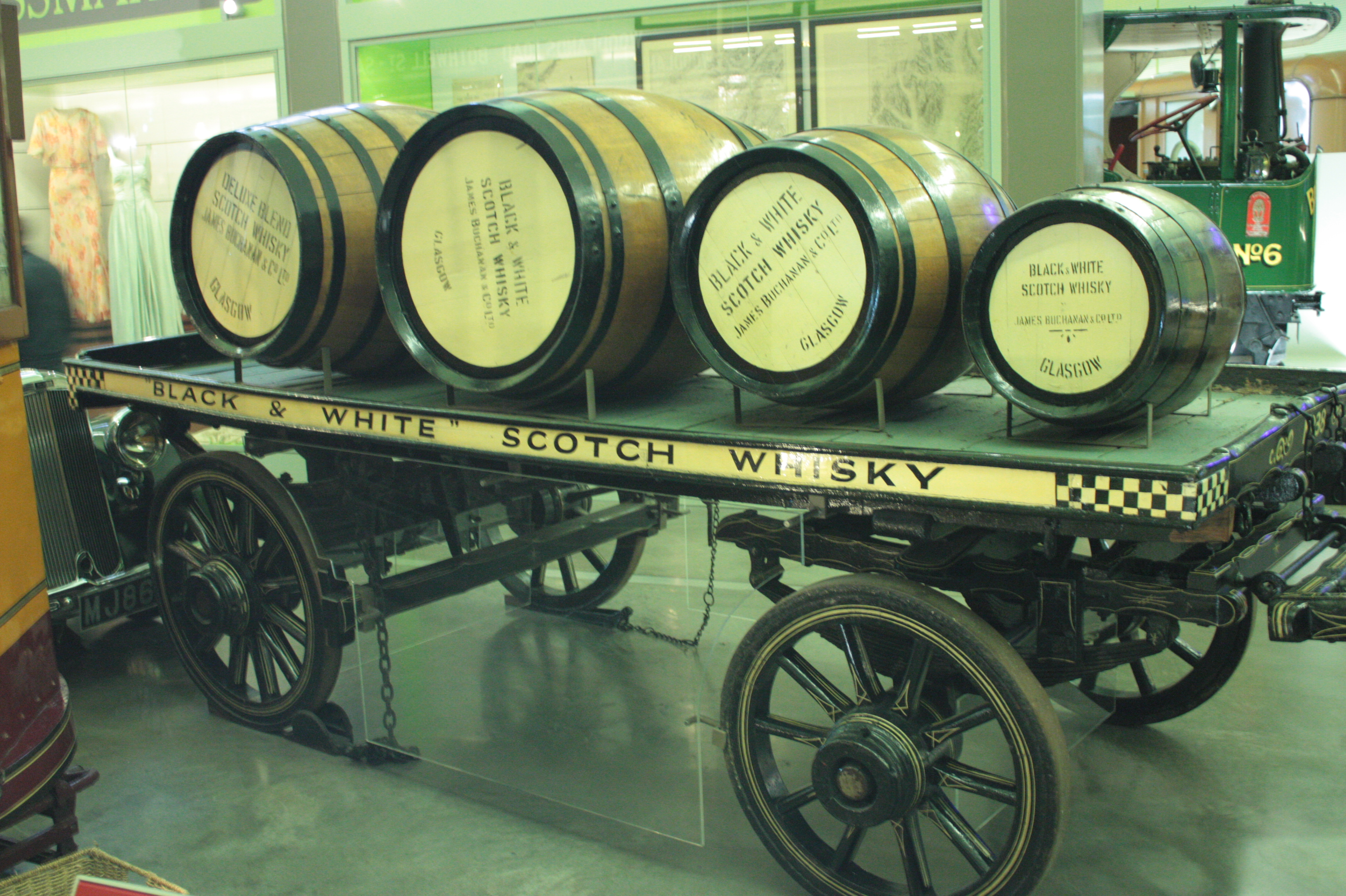
Black & White Whisky Drey, Riverside Museum, Glasgow

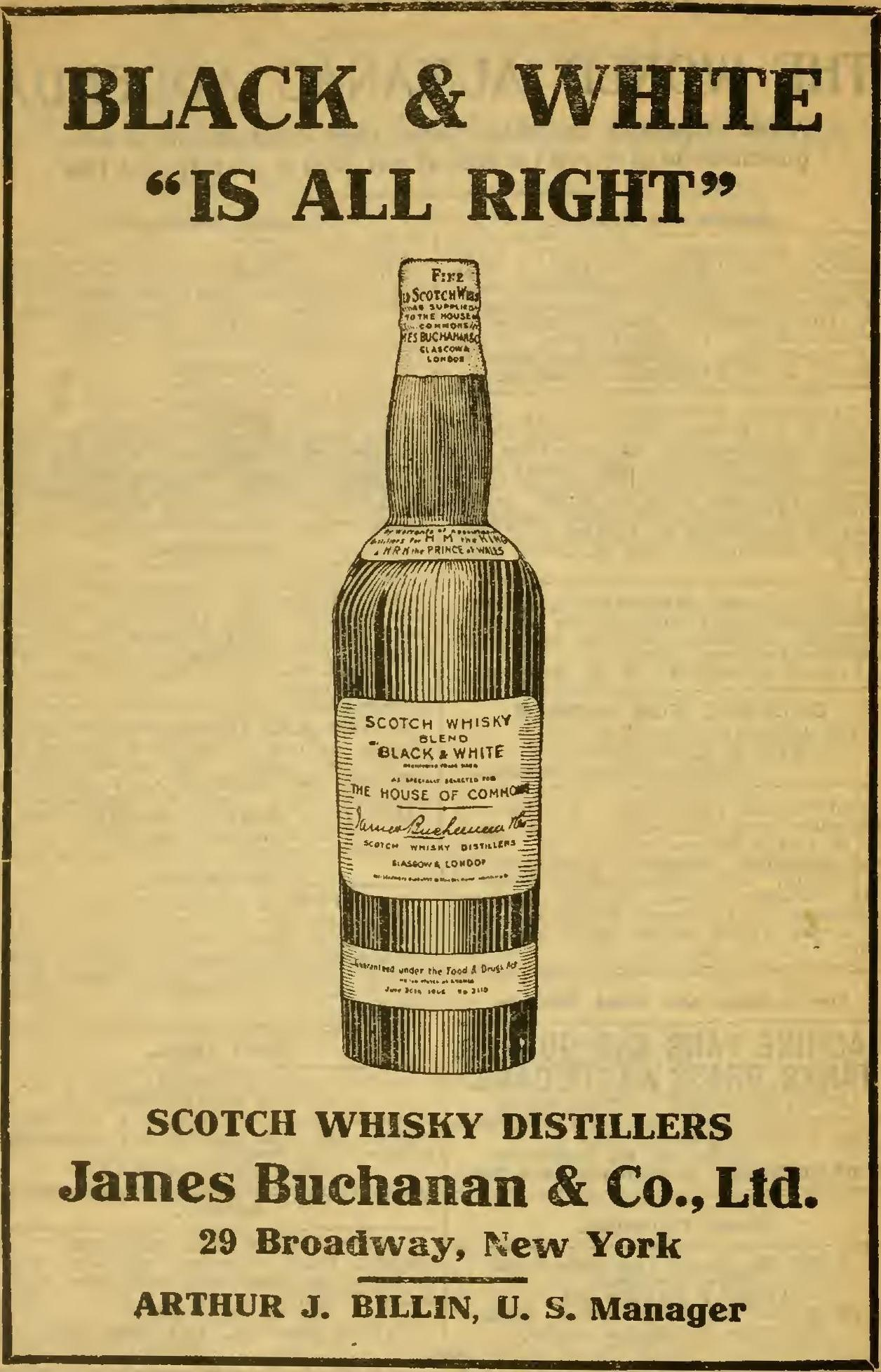
"James Buchanan & Co., Ltd. 1908 ad from the United States

Black & White is a blended Scotch whisky produced by Diageo in Scotland. It was originally produced by the London-based James Buchanan & Co Ltd, which was founded by James Buchanan.

== History ==
When it was first made in 1879, it was Initially known as Buchanan's Blend and then House of Commons (after the British House of Commons). Its nickname, referring to the black and white labelling, was eventually adopted as the official brand instead. The brand's motif (featuring a black Scottish Terrier and a white West Highland White Terrier) was conceived by James Buchanan during the 1890s.

In 1968, the Black & White brand featured in an important trademark infringement case, Maier Brewing Co. v. Fleischmann Distilling Corp., 390 F.2d 117 (9th Cir. 1968), when a brewing company started manufacturing beer under the brand name "Black and White".

After a series of mergers and acquisitions involving John Dewar & Sons (1915), Distillers Company, and Guinness (forming United Distillers), the brand is now owned by Diageo. It claims to be the most successful in France, Venezuela, and Brazil. At present, the brand is sold only outside the United Kingdom.

== In popular culture ==
- In Cheers season 6 episode 5 "The Crane Mutiny", Frasier orders a scotch, and Woody pours him a Black & White on the rocks.
- In his 1928 sonnet Huppy: The Life o' Riley, American war poet John Allan Wyeth describes an incident that took place in the French village of the same name, where Wyeth was serving with the 33rd U.S. Division during World War I. It was sometime between June 1 and 8, 1918. While on a nighttime carouse with his fellow Doughboys, Lt. Wyeth and his buddies found a village café and marched inside over the protests of the proprietress, who insisted that her place of business was closed. One of the soldiers replied, "Allez toot sweet," (Allez tout de suite means, "Go right away"), "to hell!" One of the soldiers ordered Black and White Scotch whisky. As the proprietress obliged, another Doughboy launched into a rendition of the new song, "You're in the Army Now".
- A bottle is seen on a table in a bar somewhere in the Congo in Tarzan Escapes (1936).
- Dick Diver, the main character in F. Scott Fitzgerald's 1934 novel, Tender is the Night, orders "The Blackenwite with siphon", symbolising clarity, but the French barman only has "Johnny Walkair", symbolising business as usual. He is later reported to smell of whiskey rather than whisky.
- James Bond drinks Black & White in the Ian Fleming novel Moonraker.
- James Bond shares a bottle with Felix Leiter and Quarrel in Pussfella's Bar in the 1962 film Dr. No.
- In the novel, Scruffy by Paul Gallico, a case of Black & White Scotch is the price the British must pay a Spaniard for his female Barbary ape as OIC Apes Maj. Tim Bailey and the MI-5 boffins strive to ensure Churchill’s (true) order that the ape packs be kept up to strength.
- Tom Rath drinks Black & White in the Sloan Wilson novel The Man in the Gray Flannel Suit.
- Black & White is the whisky Cary Grant was fond of in the 1964 movie Father Goose.
- Marcello Mastroianni drank Black & White with his father, his lady friend, and Paparazzo (played by Walter Santesso) (Paparazzo actually placed the order for the bottle of Black & White) in the Fellini classic film La Dolce Vita.
- In Some Girls Do (1969), the British spy film, Bulldog Drummond (played by Richard Johnson) orders Black & White with water several times.
- Physicist Richard Feynman drank Black & White, as described in his book Surely You're Joking, Mr. Feynman!.
- Herbert Kilpin, co-founder and first captain of football club AC Milan, claimed that "the only way to forget a conceded goal was to drink a sip of the hard stuff"; he reportedly kept a bottle of Black & White whisky in a hole behind the goal for such an occasion.
- Black & White whisky was featured in the film Dolores Claiborne.
- The drink is featured in the novel Breakfast of Champions by Kurt Vonnegut, in which the narrator orders a Black & White and water.
- One of the biggest hits of the Polish band Kombi is dedicated to and titled "Black & White".
- In the early opening credits of the Alfred Zeisler movie The Amazing Adventure (1936), and Louis King's Bulldog Drummond in Africa (1938), a neon sign can be briefly seen advertising Black & White whisky in the evening London cityscape.
- In the Czech movie Kamarád do deště II – Příběh z Brooklynu a bottle of this whisky was present in the hotel room and later Marek Vašut took it home.
- Frasier Crane's friend Dr. Lawrence Crandell orders a Black & White neat in season 7 episode 22 of Cheers. However, due to continuity error (most likely), it was served over rocks.
- When the antagonist in Paul Auster's 1986 novella, Ghosts (which was published as the second part of Auster's The New York Trilogy), orders a Black and White on the rocks, he is effectively revealing his identity to the novella's protagonist.
- Walt Disney reportedly ended his work days with one of his favorite cocktails, a Scotch Mist: Black & White poured over crushed ice with a lemon twist
- Along with Haig, Black & White was a favorite Scotch whisky of Dean Martin.
- Black & White was the favorite Whisky of Ludwig Erhard, the second chancellor of the German Federal Republic.
- In the 1972 French movie The Pebbles of Étretat, actor Maurice Ronet can be seen pouring a bottle of Black & White into a glass at 33:55.
- In the 1969 movie Monte Carlo or Bust!, Peter Cook and Dudley Moore have their Black and White Scotch confiscated at approximately 1:01:00 into the movie.
- In the 1977 French movie The Apprentice Heel, a bottle of Black and White Scotch can be seen being poured at 58:35.
- In the 1969 American movie The Appointment, a Black and White Scotch logo can be seen above the bar at 1:52.
- Black and White whisky figures prominently in the 1984 Malayalam (Indian) movie "Bharya Oru Devatha"
- In the 1965 movie Slalom, a bottle of Black and White can be seen next to a Martini bottle on top of a bar at the 98th minute.
- In the 1965 movie Seven Golden Men, an advertisement for Black and White can be seen on a billboard canvas in the background.
- In the 1966 movie Sex Quartet, actress Capucine orders Black and White multiple times and a case of bottles can be seen in the movie.
- Scottish artist Peter Doig references Black & White in a number of his works, including the 2013 print "Black & White".
- In the 1949 film Whisky Galore!, Black & White is one of several brands seen on the crates of whisky aboard the SS Cabinet Minister.
- In the U.K. TV comedy series Hi-de-hi, the third episode of the first series, 'The Beauty Queen affair' sees the entertainments manager Jeffrey Fairbrother being given a large bottle of the whisky as a thank you from the father of the winner of the beauty contest. This is a source of embarrassment for Mr Fairbrother as the winner of the beauty contest won fairly, Mr Fairbrother having rejected the father's original offer of a bribe. This undermines Mr Fairbrother as he had just chastised the remainder of the entertainment staff for accepting gifts and bribes from campers at the holiday camp.
