= John Allan Wyeth (poet) =

American poet

- Late 1970s
- Born: October 24, 1894; New York City, U.S.
- Died: May 11, 1981 (aged 86); Skillman, New Jersey, U.S.
- Resting place: Blawenburg Reformed Church Cemetery, Blawenburg, New Jersey, U.S.
- Education: Princeton University
- Occupations: Poet, painter
- Known for: War poetry
- Parent(s): John Allan Wyeth; Florence Nightingale Sims
- Relatives: J. Marion Sims (maternal grandfather); Marion Sims Wyeth (brother)

John Allan Wyeth (October 24, 1894 – May 11, 1981) served as a military intelligence lieutenant in the 33rd U.S. Division of the American Expeditionary Forces during World War I and subsequently became a war poet, composer, and painter. After the Armistice, Wyeth lived in Europe and became both a Post-Impressionist painter and a war poet.

According to literary critic Dana Gioia, who wrote the introduction to the 2008 reissue of Wyeth's war sonnets, Wyeth is the only American poet of the Great War who merits comparison to British war poets Siegfried Sassoon, Isaac Rosenberg, and Wilfred Owen. In response to the 2008 republication, British poet and literary critic Jon Stallworthy, the editor of The Oxford Book of War Poetry and the biographer of Wilfred Owen, wrote, "At long last, marking the ninetieth anniversary of the Armistice, an American poet takes his place in the front rank of the War Poet's parade."

== Early life ==
Wyeth's father, also named John Allan Wyeth (1845–1922), grew up on a plantation in Guntersville, Alabama, and served in the Confederate States Army during the American Civil War, and later in life became the surgeon in New York City who founded what is today the Stuyvesant Polyclinic Hospital in 1882 (which became Cabrini Medical Center).

Wyeth's mother, Florence Nightingale Sims (d.1915), was the daughter of Lancaster County, South Carolina, native J. Marion Sims, a pioneering surgeon who is considered "the father of modern gynaecology." As it was both uncontroversial and common practice at the time, Sims founded gynecology through many experimental operations upon enslaved black women without anesthesia. Although Sims' patients were willing to go through with his experimental procedures, medical ethicist Barron H. Lerner has said of Sims, "One would be hard pressed to find a more controversial figure in the history of medicine." After serving as a Confederate spy under diplomatic cover in Europe during the American Civil War, Sims also settled in New York City, founded the New York Cancer Hospital, and served as president of the American Medical Association. He is also remembered for inventing Sims' speculum, Sims' sigmoid catheter, and the Sims' position.

John Allan Wyeth was born on October 24, 1894, in New York City. His brother, Marion Sims Wyeth, became an architect. Wyeth grew up in what Dana Gioia has called "a cultured family" which attended the Episcopal Church.

Wyeth was educated at the Lawrenceville School, a Presbyterian boarding school in Lawrenceville, New Jersey. During his time at Lawrenceville, Wyeth was president of the drama club and the class poet. He published some of his work in the Lawrenceville Literary Magazine and, in 1908, a play by the 13-year old Wyeth was performed for a charity benefit.

=== Princeton ===
Wyeth began attending Princeton University in 1911. He was a member of the Princeton Charter Club. He studied mostly literature and languages. He was an average student, but contributed to the Nassau Literary Magazine and was a member of the Class Ode Committee. His friends at Princeton included Edmund Wilson and F. Scott Fitzgerald. Wilson later recalled that he and Wyeth read the novels of Henry James, and later credited Wyeth with leading him to a sympathetic understanding of James's recreation of period style and dialogue. Wyeth, unusually, had no roommate at Princeton. Wilson later described Wyeth as "the only aesthete of the Class of 1915", which according to Gioia is "almost certainly" a codeword for "homosexual". Wyeth graduated from Princeton in 1915.

After his graduation, Wyeth taught French in a high school in Mesa, Arizona, for a year, then returned to Princeton, where he intended to pursue graduate school and become a professor of Romance languages. However, he only completed a master's degree program.

== World War I ==
On December 28, 1917, almost nine months after the American entry into World War I, Wyeth enlisted in the United States Army as a second lieutenant in the 33rd Division, which was largely composed of soldiers from the Illinois Army National Guard. Because Wyeth was fluent in French, he was assigned to the Interpreter's Corps at Division HQ. After completing their training at Camp Logan in Houston, Texas, Lieut. Wyeth and the 33rd U.S. Division were transferred to Camp Upton in Yaphank, New York, to await transport overseas. On May 15, 1918, Wyeth and his division were instructed to proceed to Hoboken, New Jersey and board a troopship bound for France. In his sonnet Camp Upton: Sailing Orders, Wyeth recalls the pain of saying goodbye to a loved one after receiving the orders.

In his sonnet Camp Upton to Hoboken: Secret Troop Movement, Wyeth describes how, in the early morning of May 16, 1918, he and his fellow soldiers boarded a railroad train in Yaphank and arrived in New York City. Wyeth and his division then boarded a ferry to Hoboken. As they crossed over, Wyeth claims, someone aboard a passing ferry shouted, "Give 'em hell, boys!" and a Doughboy from the 33rd shouted back, "Give 'em hell yourself, it's not too late to join!"

Wyeth and thousands of other doughboys boarded the USS Mount Vernon, which steamed out of New York Harbor at sunset.

On May 24, 1918, the USS Mount Vernon approached the French port of Brest. In his sonnet Brest: The Waterway, Wyeth recalled the sight of French and Breton civilians enthusiastically waving and cheering over the arrival of his division. He also claims, however, that some of his fellow Doughboys made off-color jokes about the women on the dock.

Because Brest's waterfront, with its "regiments of streetwalkers" and regular drunken brawls between sailors, was considered "the scourge of the provost-marshal", Wyeth's division was diverted to barracks. Wyeth, as an officer, was at liberty to explore the city. In the sonnet Brest: The Waterfront, Wyeth claims to have seen a French war widow dressed "in shabby black." The sight supposedly made Wyeth wonder whether, after four years of war, all of France, like the widow, was "too casual and numb for tears."

On May 25, 1918, a train carrying Wyeth and his division left Brest, bound for Paris. In his sonnet The Train from Brest, Wyeth describes listening to the bickering of his fellow Doughboys accompanied by "the clank of iron beating a rackety tune." Wyeth also describes waking up to see the spires of Chartres Cathedral "against a low-hung lazy moon."

After passing the Palace of Versailles, which looked like "a bridge of shadow on a lake," the train arrived in Paris. The 33rd Division's commanding officer, Major General George Bell Jr., had received orders to proceed from Paris to Rouen. When the train arrived at the Gare Montparnasse, however, a British Army staff officer delivered new orders reassigning the 33rd Division to Oisemont. Wyeth was ordered to take his men by subway to the Gare du Nord, where they boarded a train heading north. Wyeth later recalled in his sonnet The British Front how, as they arrived at Oisemont, he and his fellow Doughboys heard for the first time, "the muffled pulse of guns along the front." That evening, Wyeth watched in the Mercerie of Oisemont as a Scottish regimental band, playing bagpipes, passed by with "kilts flapping while the drumsticks thump and fly," followed by fascinated French civilians. The church bell, however, tolled "a reprimand," as a funeral procession also passed by.

Wyeth spent the night of May 26–27, 1918, unable to sleep due to the constant arrival of "jolting troop trains", at Oisemont's "British Detraining Station", which "choked the yard with soldiers all night long." As "the grey dawn," shivered on Wyeth's "grimy skin", he took breakfast, with "cognac and coffee villainously strong." Also with the dawn, new orders arrived and assigned the 33rd U.S. Division to move ten kilometers north to Huppy. As the trains finally stopped arriving in Oisemont, Wyeth strolled down a nearby hillside and tried to sleep, while eyeing "those frail trees and the town's naïve profile."

On May 31, 1918, Division HQ was established in Huppy, where the 33rd Division was designated as part of the U.S. Army II Corps and passed under the jurisdiction of the British Fourth Army. Lt. Wyeth and his fellow Doughboys were stationed in nearby Huppy when aeroplanes from the Imperial German Flying Corps began one of their nightly bombing raids on nearby Abbeville. At the time, Abbeville was being evacuated and Wyeth versified his memories of the panic caused by the air raid in the sonnet Huppy.

In his sonnet Huppy: The Life o' Riley, Wyeth described an incident that he claims took place sometime between June 1 and 8, 1918. While out on a nighttime carouse with his fellow Doughboys, Wyeth and his buddies found a village café and marched inside despite the protests of the proprietress, who told them that her business was closed. One of the soldiers replied, "Allez toot sweet," ("toute de suite", meaning "go right away"), "to hell!" One of the soldiers ordered Black & White Scotch whiskey. As the proprietress obliged, another Doughboy launched into a rendition of the new song, You're in the Army Now.

On the night of August 8–9, 1918, as Doughboys from the 33rd U.S. Division were joining the Allied offensive during the Battle of Amiens, Wyeth and Thomas J. Cochrane were assigned to deliver sealed orders from Division HQ at Molliens-au-Bois to the Field Headquarters of all three Battalions engaged in the attack. The location of each Battalion was unknown, but they were believed to be along the northern bank of the Somme River, near the village of Sailly-le-Sec. Wyeth would later describe the mission in detail in his six interlinked "Chipilly Ridge sonnets."

On the afternoon of September 14, 1918, while the men of the 33rd U.S. Division were stationed at Fromereville near Verdun, Wyeth was taking a shower with a group of bickering Doughboys when he heard the cry, "Air Raid!" Like every other bather, Wyeth ran, naked and covered with soap, into the village square. There, he watched as a Fokker D VII, flown by Unteroffizier Hans Heinrich Marwede from Jasta 67's aerodrome at Marville, attacked and set on fire three French observation balloons. Lieut. Wyeth later described Marwede's victory in his sonnet Fromereville: War in Heaven.

== Post-war ==
After the Armistice, Wyeth served in the Weimar Republic with the Army of Occupation for nearly a year. He received an honorable discharge from the United States Army on October 23, 1919.

Wyeth delayed his return to Princeton until the following year by claiming, "a percentage of disability," that required recuperating at his older brother's home in Palm Beach, Florida. Wyeth returned to Princeton for the January term, but soon left after winning a travelling fellowship to study in Liège, Belgium. By 1923, Wyeth had finished his oral exams in both French and German.

In September 1926, Wyeth wrote to Princeton from Rapallo, Italy, and said that he wished to drop his academic studies. He explained, "I have always desired above all things to try my hand at literature." He added that he believed, "that whatever literary talent I might come to possess could be brought into play in response to a complete whole-hearted devotion to literary aims."

Wyeth remained in Rapallo until 1932. He shared a household there with his sister Florence Sims MacLean, her husband Alan MacLean, and their daughter Jane Marion MacLean. According to the obituary of Jane Marion MacLean, her tutors during the years in Rapallo included Max Beerbohm, Ezra Pound, William Butler Yeats, and Gerhard Hauptmann. Both Gioia and Omanson suspect that it was in Rapallo and under the influence of Ezra Pound's poetic philosophies of Modernism and Imagism that Wyeth wrote the sonnets that comprise his only poetry collection. According to the oral tradition of Wyeth's family, the war poet and Pound were friends.

Wyeth's book of poems, a sonnet sequence entitled This Man's Army: A War in Fifty-Odd Sonnets, was published in 1928. Wyeth's sonnets are in a mixture of iambic pentameter and the "loose five stress most commonly used in popular spoken verse." Wyeth's sonnets also use a unique rhyme scheme (ABCDABCDABECDE). They also mix Doughboy slang with words and phrases from both French and German. According to Gioia, "One assumes - and in the absence of documentary evidence this can remain only an assumption - that the young Wyeth kept a detailed journal during the war that later served as the basis of his book."

This Man's Army was favorably reviewed in Poetry in December 1932.

According to Gioia, the fact that Wyeth's collection was published so soon before the 1929 Stock Market Crash and the beginning of the Great Depression meant that This Man's Army soon slid into obscurity. Wyeth never published another book of poems.

In May 1932, Wyeth had a chance encounter with Scottish painter Duncan Grant, who was a member of the Bloomsbury Group, at Cassis-sur-Mer on the French Riviera. Grant urged Wyeth to study painting at the Académie Moderne in Paris and provided him with a letter of introduction to French artist Jean Marchand. Wyeth immediately returned to Rapallo, settled his affairs, and moved to Paris. For the next few years, he spent each winter and spring in Paris at the Académie Moderne, studying painting under Marchand, then spent the summer at Berchtesgaden in Bavaria and the autumn at the Schule Schloss Salem on the grounds of the old Cistercian monastery north of Salem. Wyeth also spent time each year painting in Greece and in British-ruled Cyprus.

At the time, Schule Schloss Salem was one of the main training centers for the Hitler Youth and Berchtesgaden had become popular vacation spot for Adolf Hitler, Martin Bormann, and other members of the Nazi Party elite. Although there is no concrete proof, there is a considerable amount of circumstantial evidence suggesting that Wyeth may have been spying on Nazi party members for American or British Intelligence.

== Later life ==
Wyeth returned to New York City in July 1938. In 1939, his paintings were exhibited at the Corcoran Gallery of Art in Washington, D.C., and the Frank Rehn Gallery in New York City. During World War II, Wyeth served in the United States Coast Guard. Omanson suspects that Wyeth, like his niece Jane Marion MacLean, may have been involved in some aspect of intelligence work.

By the early 1950s, Wyeth had been received into the Roman Catholic Church and during the 1970s was part of "a small circle of Rhode Island Catholic artists and intellectuals."

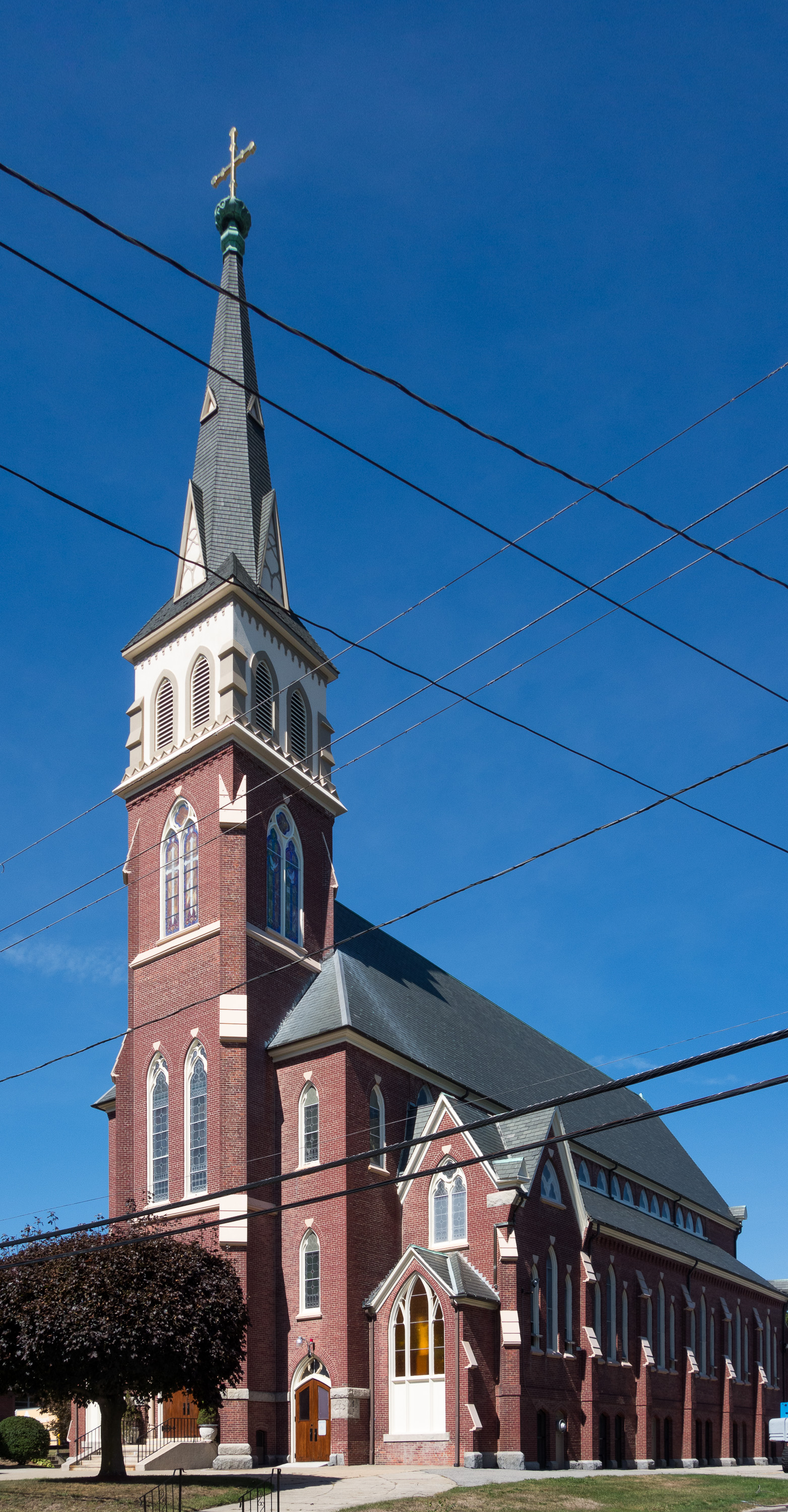
St. Edward's Catholic Church in Providence, Rhode Island.

He composed sacred music, including Missa Prima which was premiered in 1974 by a 65-voice choir for the centenary of St. Edward's Church in Providence, Rhode Island.

The Princeton alumni organization consistently failed to locate Wyeth and eventually dropped him from the 1915 Class roll, "by mutual consent."

Toward the end of his life he lived with his niece, poet Jane Marion McLean in Princeton, New Jersey.

== Death and burial ==
In 1979, Wyeth moved into a family house in Skillman, New Jersey. He died there, at the age of 86, on May 11, 1981. He was buried at the Blawenburg Reformed Church Cemetery in Blawenburg, New Jersey. His obituaries at the time did not mention his published poetry.

In 2019, Omanson wrote, "When Dana Gioia first approached the Wyeth family in 2008 to learn more about their 'Uncle John', and to request permission to reprint his sonnets, they confessed that -- as well as they had known him -- they had no idea that he had ever published a book of poems. But it didn't surprise them ... And when ... I first raised the possibility that their great-uncle might have been a spy in Nazi Germany between the wars -- once again, none of them seemed all that surprised."

== Rediscovery ==
During the early 1990s, independent scholar BJ Omanson found a copy of This Man's Army inside a used bookstore in Morgantown, West Virginia. While subsequently researching at his local university library, Omanson discovered a few positive reviews of This Man's Army, but nothing about its author's life or identity. After finding the 1945 anthology Poet Physicians, Omanson saw that a few of Wyeth's war poems were included and were incorrectly credited to his father, who was described as a famous surgeon and veteran of the Confederate States Army during the American Civil War.

Of the notable literary critics Omanson contacted, only Dana Gioia, with whom he had already been corresponding about the New Formalist Movement in American poetry, expressed any interest in Wyeth. As a result, Omanson sent Gioia a copy of This Man's Army in 1994 and asked for his opinion.

In October 2008, a new edition of "This Man's Army," with a biographical and interpretive introduction by Gioia (which first appeared in the 2008 Summer issue of the Hudson Review), and annotations by Omanson, was re-published by the University of South Carolina Press, as part of Matthew Bruccoli's Great War Series of Lost Literary Classics of World War I. British poet and literary critic Jon Stallworthy, the editor of The Oxford Book of War Poetry and the biographer of Wilfred Owen, wrote, "At long last, marking the ninetieth anniversary of the Armistice, an American poet takes his place in the front rank of the War Poet's parade."
