= Sailly-le-Sec =

- Commune
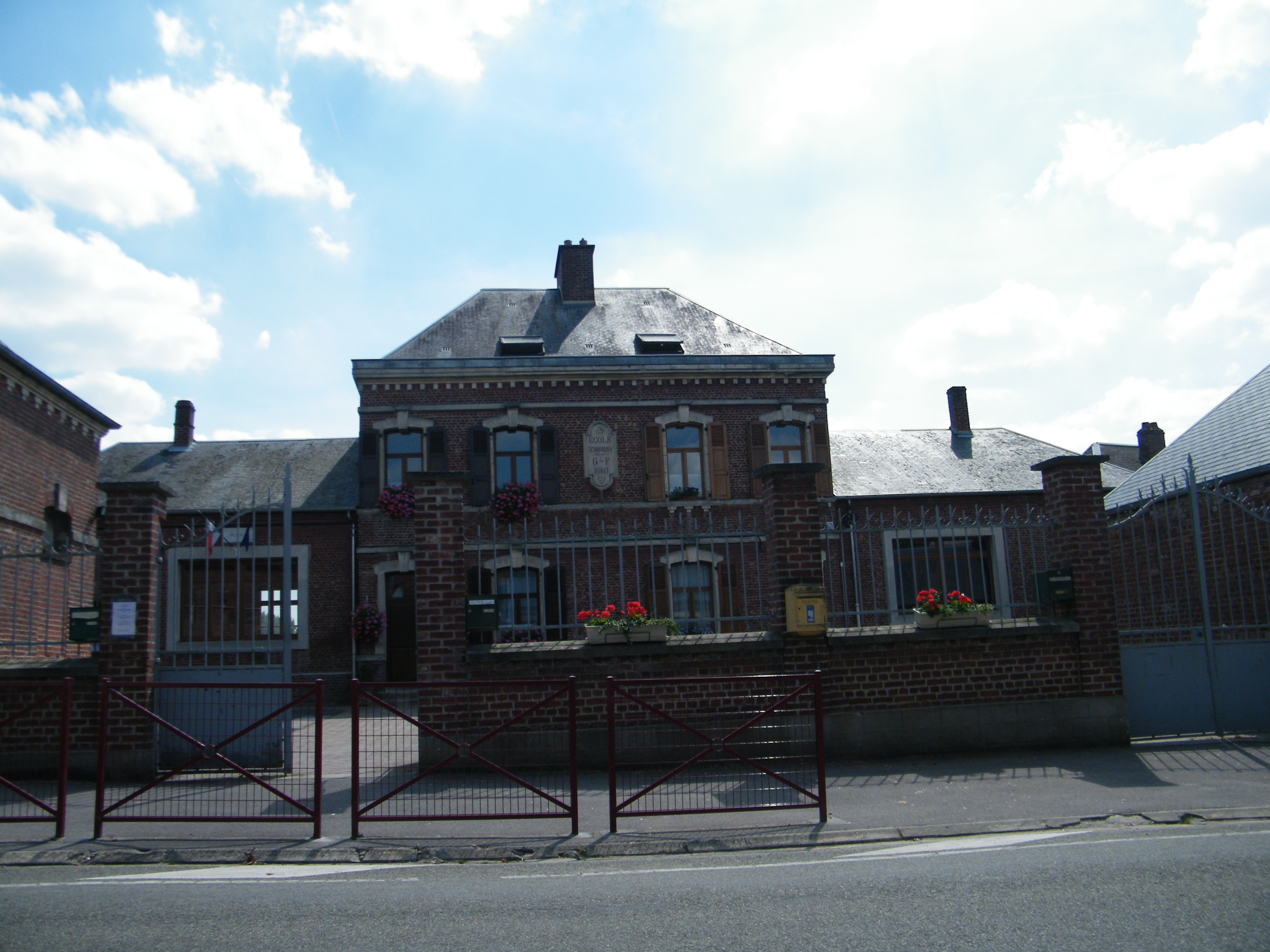
- The town hall and school in Sailly-le-Sec

- Coat of arms
- Location of Sailly-le-Sec
- Location within France Location within Hauts-de-France
- Coordinates: 49°55′16″N 2°35′01″E
- Country: France
- Region: Hauts-de-France
- Department: Somme
- Arrondissement: Amiens
- Canton: Corbie
- Intercommunality: Val de Somme

Government
  - Mayor (2020–2026): Catherine Candelier
- Area^{1}: 6.74 km^{2} (2.60 sq mi)
- Elevation: 60 m (200 ft)
- Highest elevation: 112 m (367 ft)
- Lowest elevation: 27 m (89 ft)
- Population (2023): 351
  - Density: 52.1/km^{2} (135/sq mi)
- Time zone: UTC+01:00 (CET)
  - Summer (DST): UTC+02:00 (CEST)
- INSEE/Postal code: 80694 /80800
- ^{1} French Land Register data, which excludes lakes, ponds, glaciers > 1 km^{2} (0.386 sq mi or 247 acres) and river estuaries.

Sailly-le-Sec (French pronunciation: [saji lə sɛk]; Picard: Sailly-Sé) is a commune in the Somme department in Hauts-de-France in northern France.

== Geography ==
The commune is situated some 13 miles (21 km) east of Amiens, by the banks of the river Somme, on the D233 road.

== Population ==
Historical population
Year	Pop.	±% p.a.
1968	223	—
1975	214	−0.59%
1982	198	−1.10%
1990	268	+3.86%
1999	266	−0.08%
2007	365	+4.03%
2012	343	−1.24%
2017	352	+0.52%
2023	351	−0.05%
Source: INSEE

== History ==
21 April 1918 - Manfred Von Richthofen, The Red Baron, was finally shot down here.

On the night of August 8–9, 1918, as three Battalions of Doughboys from the 33rd U.S. Infantry Division were joining the Allied offensive during the Battle of Amiens, American war poet Lieut. John Allan Wyeth and Lieut. Thomas J. Cochrane were assigned to deliver sealed orders from Division HQ at Molliens-au-Bois to the Field Headquarters of all three Battalions engaged in the attack. The location of each Battalion was unknown, but they were believed to be along the northern bank of the Somme River, near the village of Sailly-le-Sec. Wyeth would later describe the mission in detail in his six interlinked Chipilly Ridge sonnets.

== See also ==
- Communes of the Somme department
