= Battle of Amiens (1918) =

First World War allied offensive operation

- Part of the Western Front of World War I
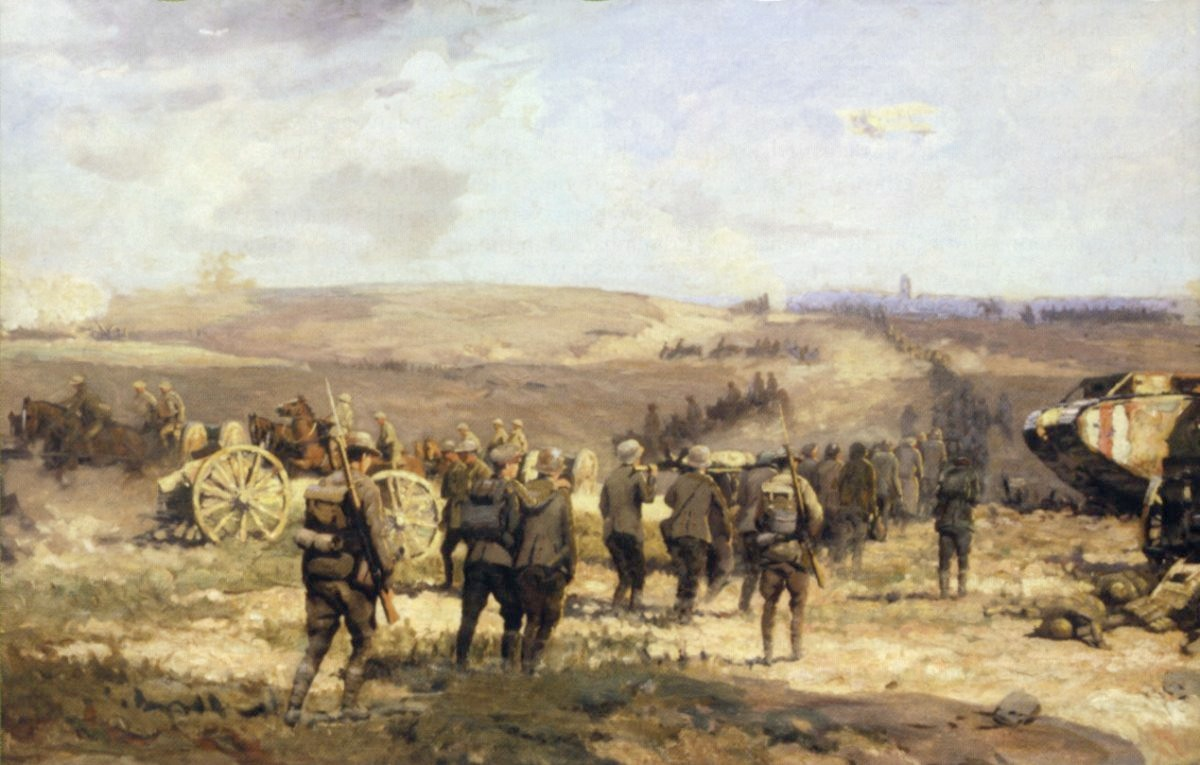
- 8 August 1918, a painting by Will Longstaff, showing Imperial German Army prisoners of war being led towards Amiens, France
Date	8–12 August 1918
Location	East of Amiens, Picardy, France 49°53′38″N 2°17′39″E
Result	Allied victory

Belligerents
United Kingdom and Empire: Canada; Australia; France; United States	German Empire

Commanders and leaders
(French Third Republic) Ferdinand Foch; (United Kingdom of Great Britain and Ireland) Douglas Haig; (United Kingdom of Great Britain and Ireland) Henry Rawlinson; (Canada) Sir Arthur William Currie; (Australia) Sir John Monash; (French Third Republic) Marie-Eugène Debeney; (French Third Republic) Georges Humbert	(German Empire) Paul von Hindenburg; (German Empire) Erich Ludendorff; (German Empire) Georg von der Marwitz; (German Empire) Oskar von Hutier

Strength
(French Third Republic); 23 active divisions; 1 reserve division; 1,104 aircraft; (United Kingdom of Great Britain and Ireland); 16 active divisions; 3 reserve divisions; 800 aircraft; (United States); 1 active division	(German Empire); 26 active divisions; 9 reserve divisions; 365 aircraft

Casualties and losses
(French Third Republic) 24,232; (United Kingdom of Great Britain and Ireland) 22,202	45,000 killed or wounded 29,873 captured

The Battle of Amiens, also known as the Third Battle of Picardy, was the opening phase of the Allied offensive which began on 8 August 1918, later known as the Hundred Days Offensive, which ultimately led to the end of World War I. Allied forces advanced over 11 kilometres (7 mi) on the first day, one of the greatest advances of the war, with Gen Henry Rawlinson's British Fourth Army, with nine of its 19 divisions supplied by the fast-moving Australian Corps of Lt General John Monash and Canadian Corps of Lt General Arthur Currie, and Gen Marie Eugène Debeney's French First Army playing a decisive role. The battle is also notable for its effects on both sides' morale and the large number of surrendering German forces. This led Erich Ludendorff to later describe the first day of the battle as "the black day of the German Army". Amiens was one of the first major battles involving armoured warfare.

== Background ==
On 21 March 1918, the German Army had launched Operation Michael, the first in a series of attacks planned to drive the Allies back along the length of the Western Front. After the signing of the Treaty of Brest-Litovsk with revolutionary-controlled Russia, the Germans were able to transfer hundreds of thousands of men to the Western Front, giving them a significant, if temporary, advantage in manpower and materiel. These offensives were intended to translate this advantage into victory. Operation Michael was intended to defeat the right wing of the British Expeditionary Force (BEF), but a lack of success around Arras ensured the ultimate failure of the offensive. A final effort was aimed at the town of Amiens, a vital railway junction, but the advance had been halted at Villers-Bretonneux by British and Australian troops on 4 April.

Subsequent German offensives – Operation Georgette (9–11 April), Operation Blücher-Yorck (27 May), Operation Gneisenau (9 June) and Operation Marne-Rheims (15–17 July) – all made advances elsewhere on the Western Front, but failed to achieve a decisive breakthrough.

By the end of the Marne-Rheims offensive, the German manpower advantage had been spent, and their supplies and troops were exhausted. The Allied general, General Ferdinand Foch, ordered a counteroffensive which led to victory at the Second Battle of the Marne, following which he was promoted to Marshal of France. The Germans, recognising their untenable position, withdrew from the Marne to the north. Foch now tried to move the Allies back onto the offensive.

== Prelude ==
=== Plan ===
Foch disclosed the plan on 23 July, following the Allied victory at the Battle of Soissons. The plan called for reducing the Saint-Mihiel salient (which would later see combat in the Battle of Saint-Mihiel) and freeing the railway lines that ran through Amiens from German shellfire.

The commander of the British Expeditionary Force, Field Marshal Sir Douglas Haig, already had plans in place for an attack near Amiens. When the British retreat had ended in April, the headquarters of the British Fourth Army under General Sir Henry Rawlinson had taken over the front astride the Somme. Its left-hand corps was the British III Corps under Lieutenant General Richard Butler. At the same time, the Australian Corps under Lieutenant General John Monash held the right flank and linked up with French armies to the south. On 30 May, all the Australian infantry divisions were united under the corps HQ for the first time on the Western Front. The Australians had mounted several local counter-attacks which both revealed the suitability of the open and firm terrain south of the Somme for a larger offensive, and established and refined the methods which were to be used.

The plan's mastermind was Monash, who used the same innovation and mastery of modern technology, particularly tanks, that he had demonstrated five weeks earlier in the Battle of Hamel. Sir Douglas Haig recorded in his diary how Monash had told him that he "had all the threads of the operation in his hands."

Rawlinson submitted Monash's proposals to Haig in July, and Haig forwarded them to Foch. At a meeting on 24 July, Foch agreed to the plan but insisted that the French First Army, which held the front to the south of the British Fourth Army, should participate. Rawlinson opposed this as his and Monash's plans depended on the large-scale use of tanks (now finally available in large numbers) to achieve surprise by avoiding a preliminary bombardment. The French First Army lacked tanks and would be forced to bombard the German positions before the infantry advance began, thus removing the element of surprise. Eventually, it was agreed that the French would participate but not launch their attack until 45 minutes after the Fourth Army. It was also agreed to advance the proposed date of the attack from 10 to 8 August to strike the Germans before they had completed their withdrawal from the Marne salient.

Rawlinson had already finalised his plans on 21 July after discussing them with his Corps commanders (Butler, Monash, Sir Arthur Currie of the Canadian Corps and Lieutenant General Charles Kavanagh of the Cavalry Corps). For the first time, the Australians would attack with the Canadian Corps.

The Australians tested the tactical methods in a local counter-attack at the Battle of Hamel on 4 July. The German defenders of Hamel were deeply dug in, and their position commanded a vast field of fire. Similar positions had resisted capture for two months in the Battle of the Somme. The Australians used surprise rather than weight at Hamel. The artillery opened fire only at the moment the infantry and tanks advanced, and the German defenders were rapidly overrun.

A critical factor in the final plan was secrecy. There was to be no long artillery bombardment before the attack, as was the usual practice, only fire immediately before the advance of Australian, Canadian, and British forces. The final plan for the Fourth Army involved 1,386 field guns and howitzers and 684 heavy guns, making up 27 medium artillery brigades and thirteen heavy batteries, in addition to the infantry divisions' artillery. The fire plan for the Fourth Army's artillery was devised by Monash's senior artillery officer, Major General C. E. D. Budworth. British sound ranging advances in artillery techniques and aerial photographic reconnaissance made it possible to dispense with "ranging shots" to ensure accurate fire. Budworth had produced a timetable which allowed 504 out of 530 German guns to be hit at "zero hour", while a creeping barrage preceded the infantry. This method was similar to the Feuerwalze which the Germans themselves had used in their Spring Offensive, but its effectiveness was increased by the surprise of the attack.

Almost 600 tanks participated in the attack. The Canadian and Australian Corps were each allocated a brigade of four battalions, with 108 Mark V fighting tanks, 36 Mark V "Star", and 24 unarmed tanks intended to carry supplies and ammunition forward. One battalion of Mark V tanks was allocated to the III Corps. The Cavalry Corps were allocated two battalions each of 48 Medium Mark A Whippet tanks.

The Allies moved the Canadian Corps of four infantry divisions to Amiens without being detected by the Germans. This was a noteworthy achievement and reflected well on the increasingly efficient staff work of the British armies. A detachment from the Corps of two infantry battalions, a wireless unit, and a casualty clearing station were sent to the front near Ypres to bluff the Germans into believing the entire Corps was moving north to Flanders. The Canadian Corps was not fully in position until 7 August, only one day before the attack was launched. To maintain secrecy, the Allied commanders pasted the notice "Keep Your Mouth Shut" into orders issued to the men and referred to the action as a "raid" rather than an "offensive".

=== Preliminaries ===
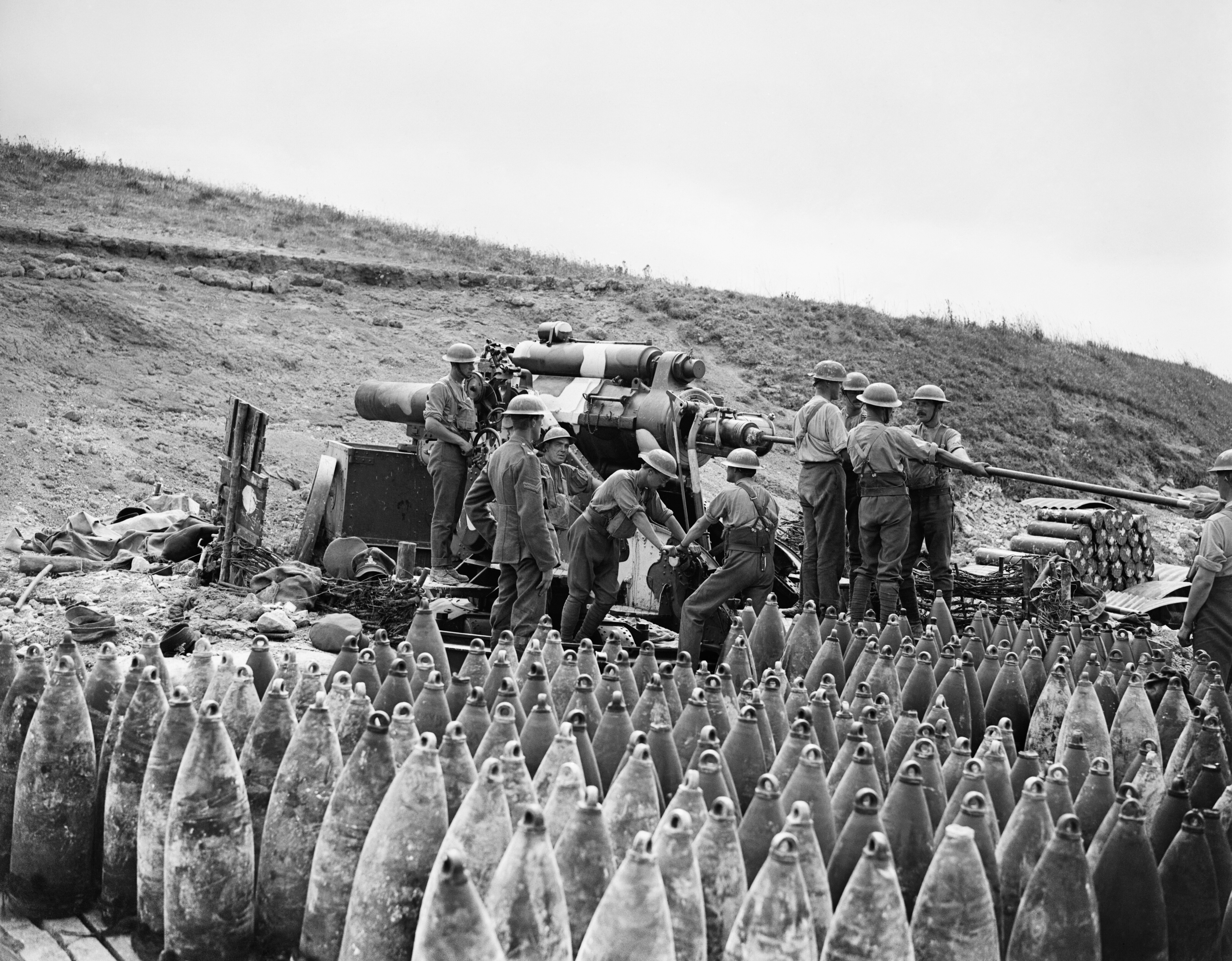
Men of the Royal Garrison Artillery loading a 9.2-inch howitzer near Bayencourt just before the battle

Although the Germans were still on the offensive in late July, the Allied armies strengthened as more American units arrived in France. British reinforcements were transferred from the Home Army in Britain and the Sinai and Palestine Campaign. The German commanders realised in early August that their forces might be forced onto the defensive, though Amiens was not considered to be a likely front. The Germans believed the French would probably attack the Saint-Mihiel front east of Rheims, or in Flanders near Mount Kemmel, while they believed the British would attack along either the Lys or near Albert. The Allies had indeed mounted several local counter-offensives in these sectors to gain local objectives, improve their defensive positions, and distract attention from the Amiens sector. German forces began withdrawing from the Lys and other fronts in response to these theories. The Allies maintained equal artillery and air fire along their various fronts, moving troops only at night and feigning movements during the day to mask their actual intent.

The German front east of Amiens was held by their Second Army (General Georg von der Marwitz) with six divisions in line (and two facing the French 1st Army). There were only two divisions in immediate reserve. There was some concern among the Allies on 6 August when the German 27th Division attacked north of the Somme on the part of the front on which the Allies planned to attack two days later. The German division (a specially selected and trained Stosstruppen formation) penetrated roughly 800 yards (730 m) into the one-and-a-half-mile front. This attack was made in retaliation for a trench raid by the 5th Australian Division north of the Somme on the night of 31 July, which had taken many prisoners before the Australian Corps was concentrated south of the river. The German division moved back towards its original position on the morning of 7 August, but the movement still required changes to the Allied plan.

The rumble of the approaching tanks was to be masked by bombers flying up and down the German lines. The bombers were twin-engine Handley Page O-400 bombers with engines similar to the tanks. The two RAF squadrons detailed to take part decided it was too hazardous to order planes into the air in the unseasonably dense fog and asked for volunteers. Two volunteered from 207 Squadron, Captains Gordon Flavelle and William Peace, and both were awarded the Distinguished Flying Cross.

== Battle ==
=== First phase ===
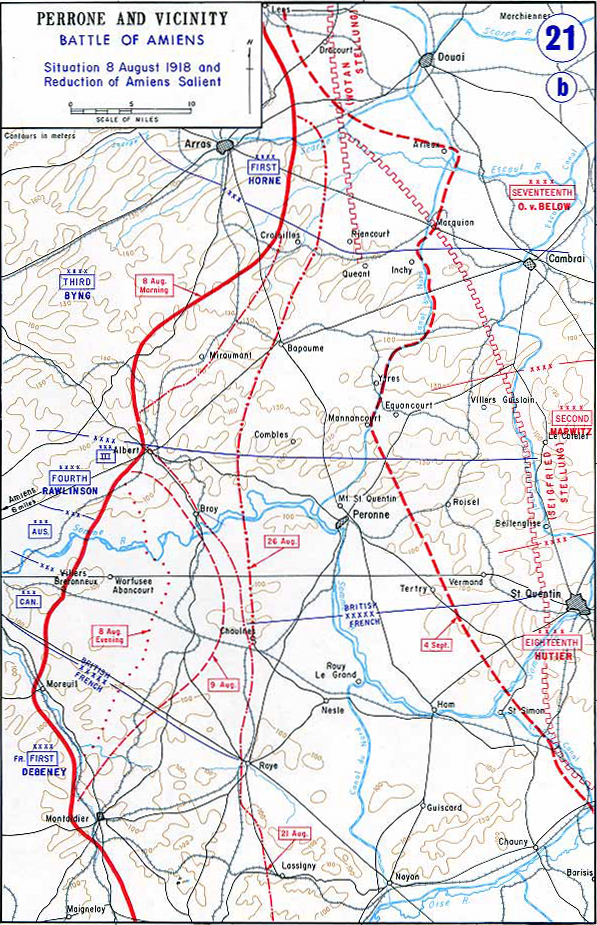
Map depicting the advance of the Allied line

The battle began in dense fog at 4:20 am on 8 August. Under Rawlinson's Fourth Army, the British III Corps attacked north of the Somme, the Australian Corps to the south of the river in the centre of Fourth Army's front, and the Canadian Corps to the south of the Australians. The French 1st Army under General Debeney opened its preliminary bombardment at the same time and began its advance 45 minutes later, supported by a battalion of 72 Whippet tanks. Although German forces were on the alert, this was mainly in anticipation of possible retaliation for their incursion on the sixth and not because they had learned of the preplanned Allied attack. Although the two forces were within 460 metres (500 yd) of one another, gas bombardment was very low, as the bulk of the Allied presence was unknown to the Germans. The attack was so unexpected that German forces only began to return fire after five minutes, and even then, at the positions where the Allied forces had assembled at the start of the battle and had long since left.

In the first phase, seven divisions attacked: the British 18th (Eastern) and 58th (2/1st London), the Australian 2nd and 3rd, and the Canadian 1st, 2nd and 3rd Divisions. Troops of the 33rd Infantry Division of the U.S. Army National Guard supported the British attackers north of the Somme.

The attackers captured the first German position, advancing about 3.7 km (4,000 yd; 2.3 mi) by about 7:30 am. In the centre, supporting units following the leading divisions attacked the second objective a further 3.2 km (2.0 mi) distant. Australian units reached their first objectives by 7:10 am, and by 8:20 am, the Australian 4th and 5th Divisions and the Canadian 4th Division passed through the initial breach in the German lines. The third phase of the attack was assigned to infantry-carrying Mark V* tanks; however, the infantry was able to carry out this final step unaided. The Allies penetrated well to the rear of the German defenses, and cavalry now continued the advance, one brigade in the Australian sector and two cavalry divisions in the Canadian sector. Aircraft fire by the new RAF and armoured car fire kept the retreating Germans from rallying.

The Canadian and Australian forces in the centre advanced quickly, pushing the line 4.8 km (3.0 mi) forward from its starting point by 11:00 am. The speed of their advance was such that a party of German officers and some divisional staff were captured while eating breakfast. A gap 24 km (15 mi) long was punched in the German line south of the Somme by the end of the day. There was less success north of the river, where the British III Corps had only a single tank battalion in support, the terrain was rougher, and the German incursion of 6 August had disrupted some of the preparations. The corps gained its first objectives but was held up short of the Chipilly spur, "a bare seventy-five-foot-high ridge" in an oxbow bend of the Somme near the village of Chipilly.

The French forces on the right flank also attacked, capturing Moreuil by 9:30 am. They shelled the Germans for three hours and twenty minutes. The French IX Corps began to advance but was stopped on the Avre. Later, the XXXI Corps took Mézières and occupied Fresnoy by nine o'clock. The French suffered 3,500 casualties and took over 5,000 German soldiers prisoner.

The Allies penetrated 10 miles, at a cost of 12,000 casualties, and captured over 15,000 prisoners. Total German losses were estimated to be 30,000 on 8 August. The British, Australian and Canadian infantry of the Fourth Army sustained about 8,000 casualties, with further losses by tank and air personnel, and French forces.

German Army Chief of Staff Paul von Hindenburg noted the Allies' use of surprise and that Allied destruction of German lines of communication had hampered potential German counter-attacks by isolating command positions. The German General Erich Ludendorff described the first day of Amiens as the "Schwarzer Tag des deutschen Heeres" (the "black day of the German Army"), not because of the ground lost to the advancing Allies, but because the morale of the German troops had sunk to the point where large numbers of troops began to capitulate. He recounted instances of retreating troops shouting "You're prolonging the war!" at officers who tried to rally them, and "Blackleg!" at reserves moving up. Five German divisions had effectively been engulfed. Allied forces had pushed, on average, 11 km (6.8 mi) into enemy territory by the end of the day. The Canadians gained 13 km (8.1 mi), Australians 11 km (6.8 mi), the French 8 km (5.0 mi), and the British 3.2 km (2.0 mi).

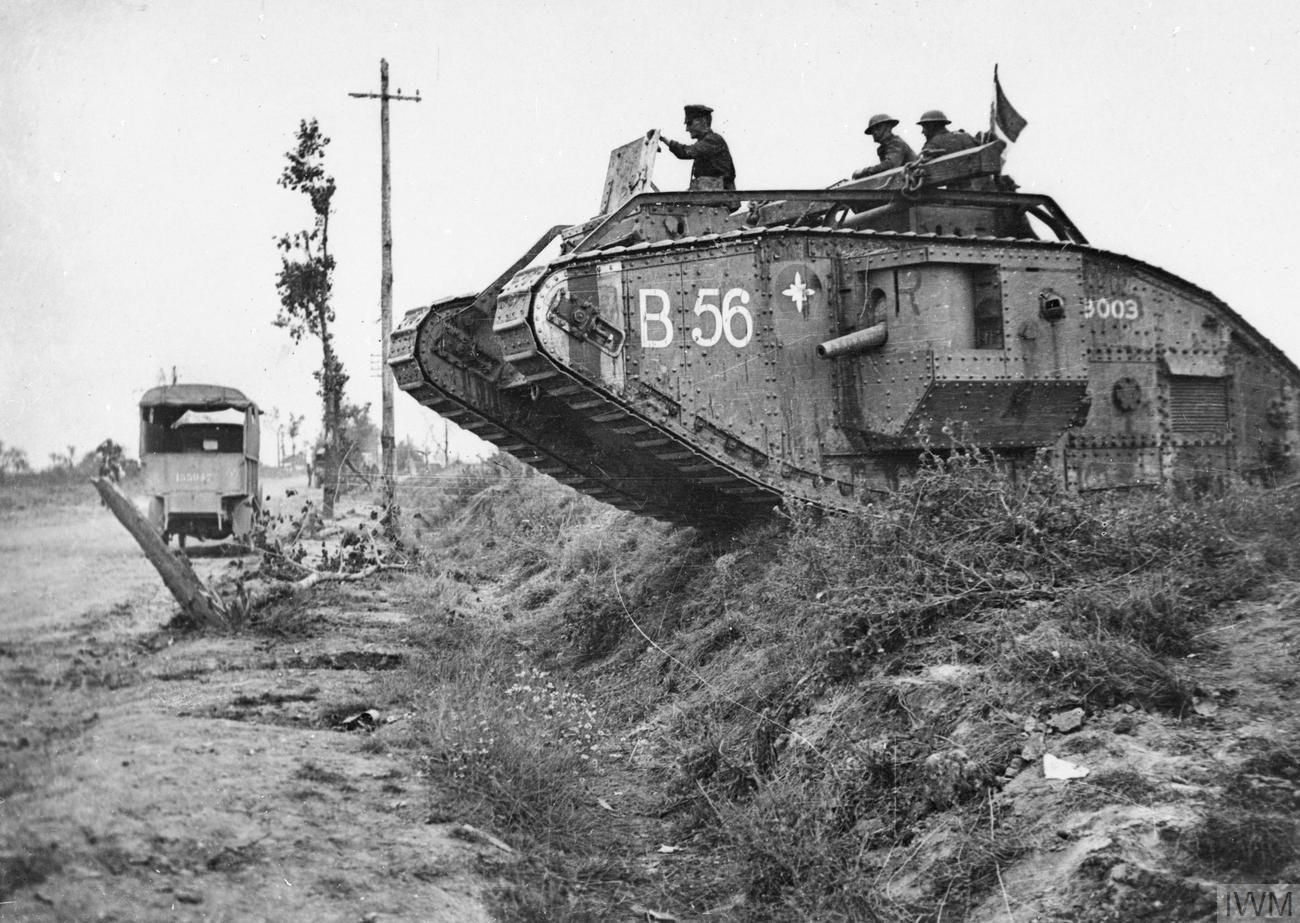
British Mark V tank (B56, 9003) of the 2 Battalion, Tank Corps traversing a ditch at the side of a road at Lamotte-en-Santerre, 8 August 1918.

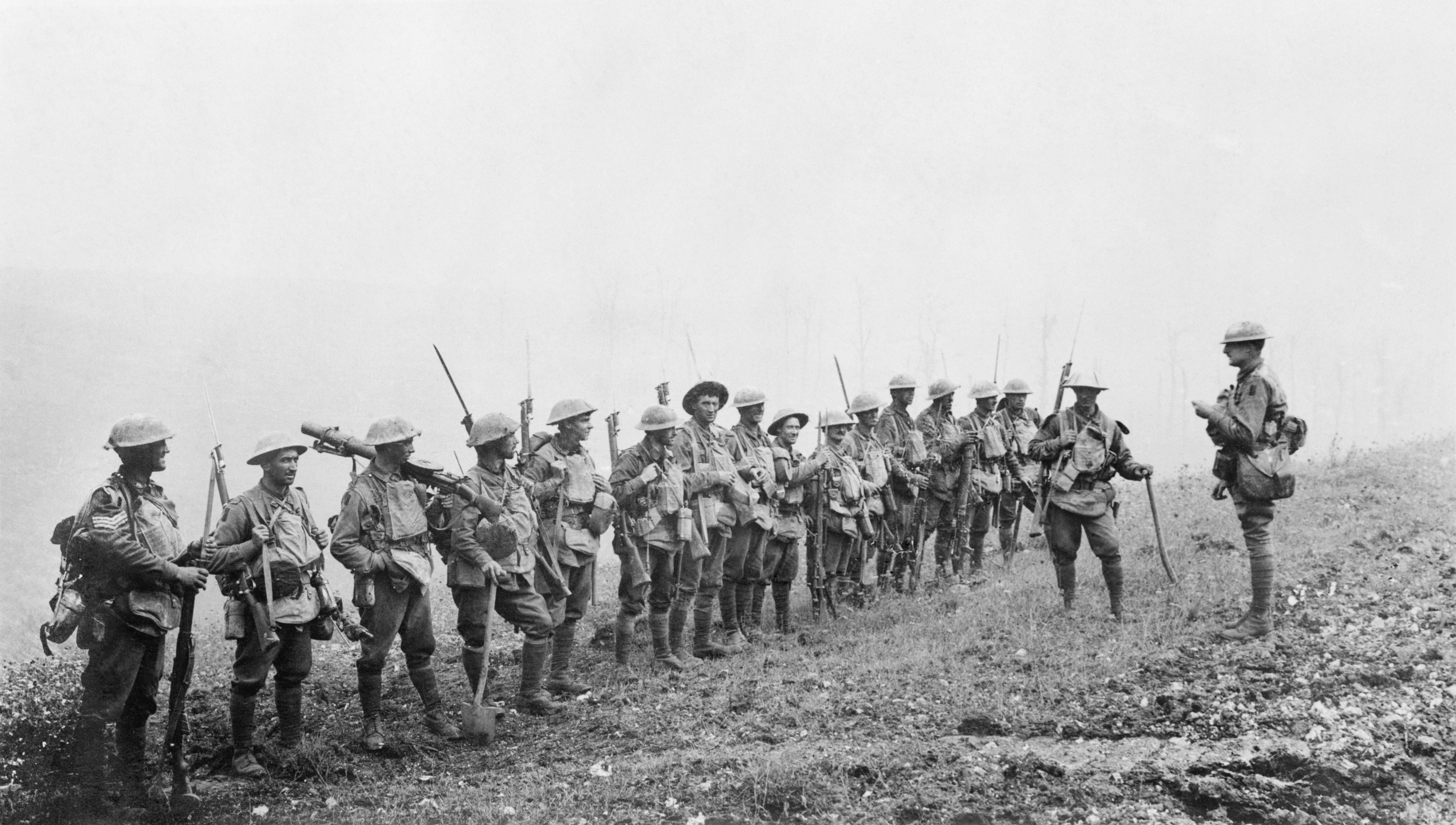
An Australian Lieutenant addressing his platoon before the advance onto Harbonnières which is obscured by smoke from heavy shellfire.

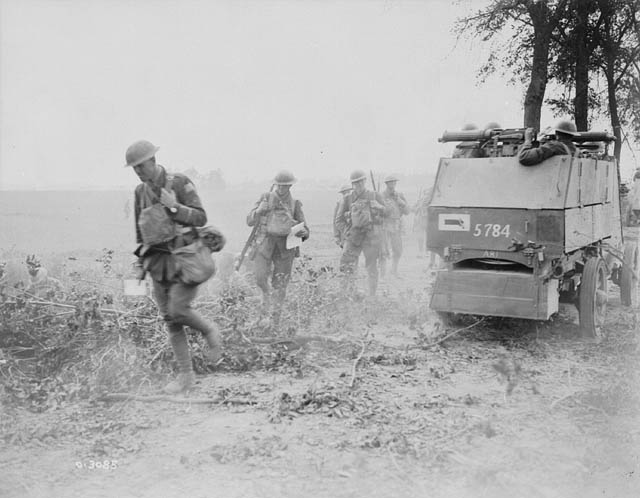
Canadian troops supported by an armoured car go into action at the Battle of Amiens

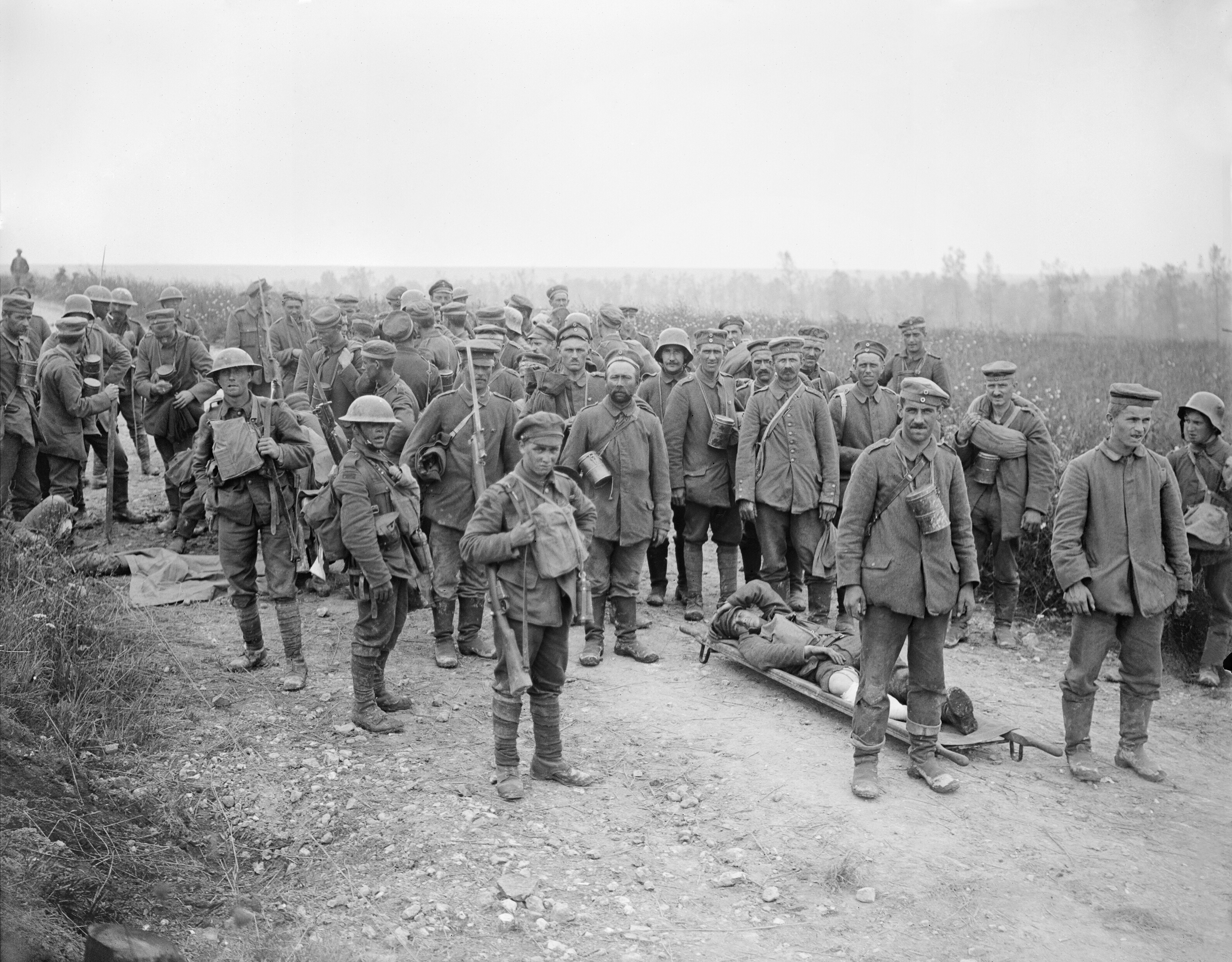
German prisoners guarded by British soldiers of the 58th Division at Sailly Laurette, 8 August 1918.

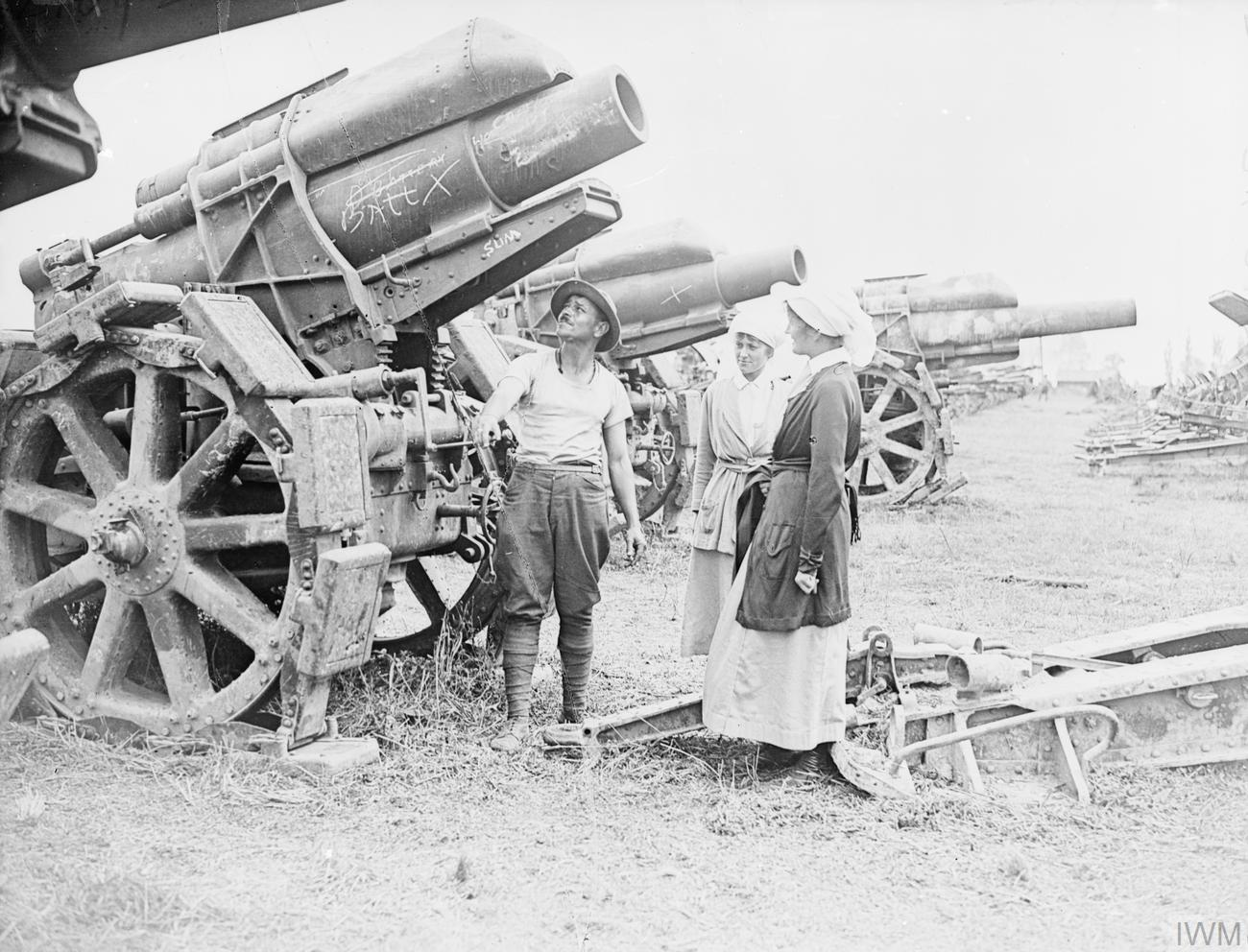
Two nurses checking a 21 cm Mörser 16 heavy howitzer at a dump of German artillery captured by the British Fourth Army.

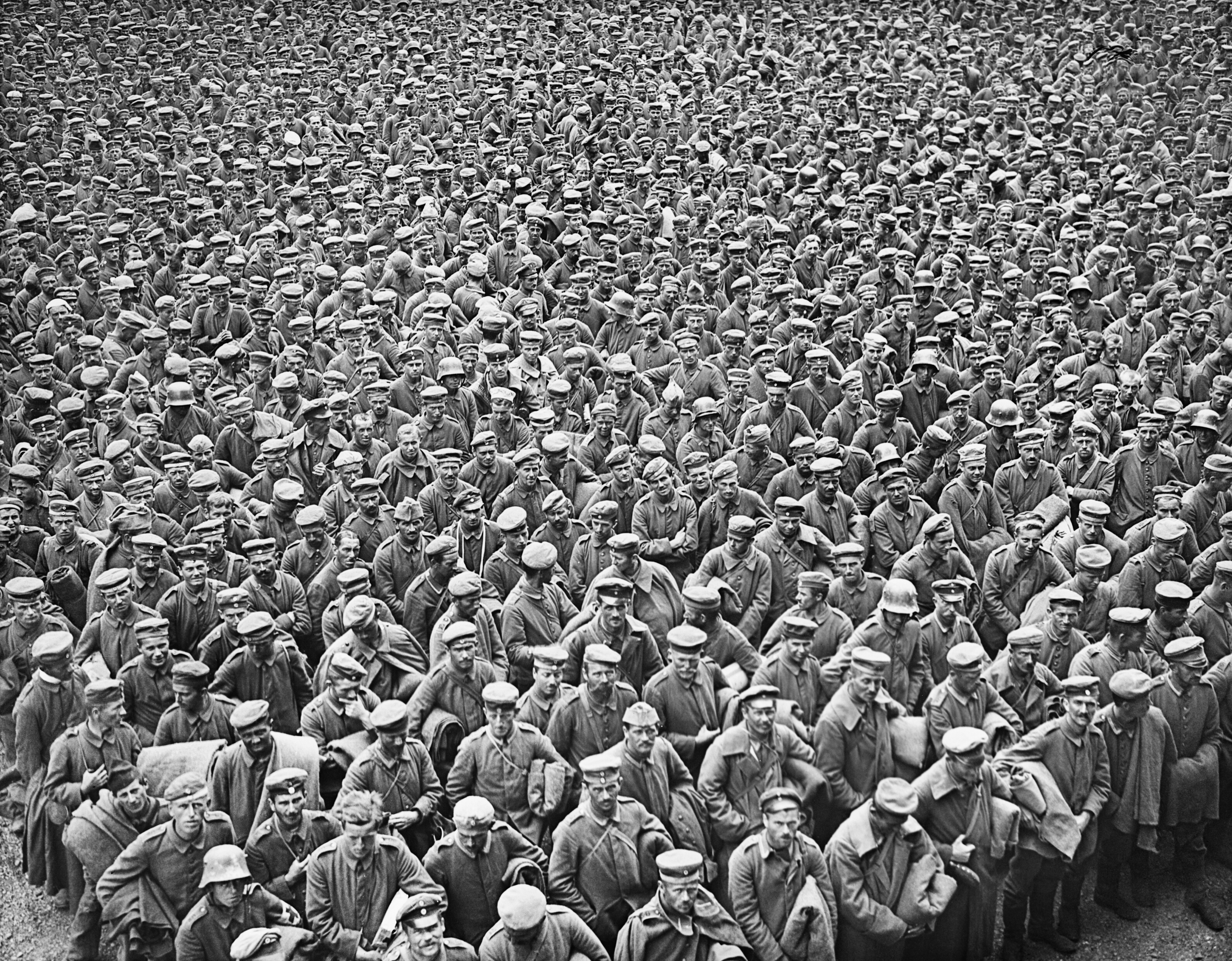
A crowd of German prisoners taken by the British Fourth Army in the Battle of Amiens, near Abbeville

=== Second phase ===
The advance continued on 9 August, though without the spectacular results of the first day. The battle was widened on the north and the south of the initial attack, with the southern part of the battle (involving French forces) called Battle of Montdidier (French: Bataille de Montdidier).

The infantry had outrun the supporting artillery, and the initial force of more than 500 tanks that played a prominent role in the Allied success was reduced to six battle-ready tanks within four days. On the Canadian front, congested roads and communication problems prevented the British 32nd Division from being pushed forward rapidly enough to maintain the momentum of the advance.

The Chipilly Spur was still in German hands. The Germans on the ridge commanded a wide field of fire to the south of the Somme. They poured devastating machine gun and artillery fire that kept the Australian Corps pinned down across the river at Hamel. The job of taking Chipilly Ridge was ultimately assigned to three battalions of American doughboys from the 33rd U.S. Infantry Division. According to B.J. Omanson,

"Their attack took place at 5:30 p.m. and, despite heavy machine gun and artillery fire pouring down on them from Chipilly Ridge, the Americans could not be driven back. They repeatedly pressed the assault until the northern half of the ridge and the southern end of nearby Gressaire Wood were taken. Continuing the assault the following day, they took the rest of Gressaire Wood and by day's end had seven hundred German prisoners, thirty artillery pieces, one aircraft, and more than one hundred machine guns."

During the 33rd U.S. Division's assault on Chipilly Ridge, Corporal Jake Allex, a Serbian immigrant from Kosovo, took command of his platoon after all the other officers had been killed. Corporal Allex led them in an attack against a German machine gun nest, during which he personally killed five enemy soldiers and captured fifteen prisoners. For his actions at Chipilly Ridge, Corporal Allex became the second American soldier to be awarded the Medal of Honor during the First World War.

On 10 August, there were signs that the Germans were pulling out of the salient from Operation Michael. According to official reports, the Allies had captured nearly 50,000 prisoners and 500 guns by 27 August. Even with the lessened armour, the British drove 19 km (12 mi) into German positions by 13 August.

Field Marshal Haig refused the request of Marshal Foch to continue the offensive, preferring instead to launch a fresh offensive by Julian Byng's Third Army between the Ancre and Scarpe. This offensive, the Second Battle of the Somme, took place 21 August – 3 September 1918.

== Aftermath ==
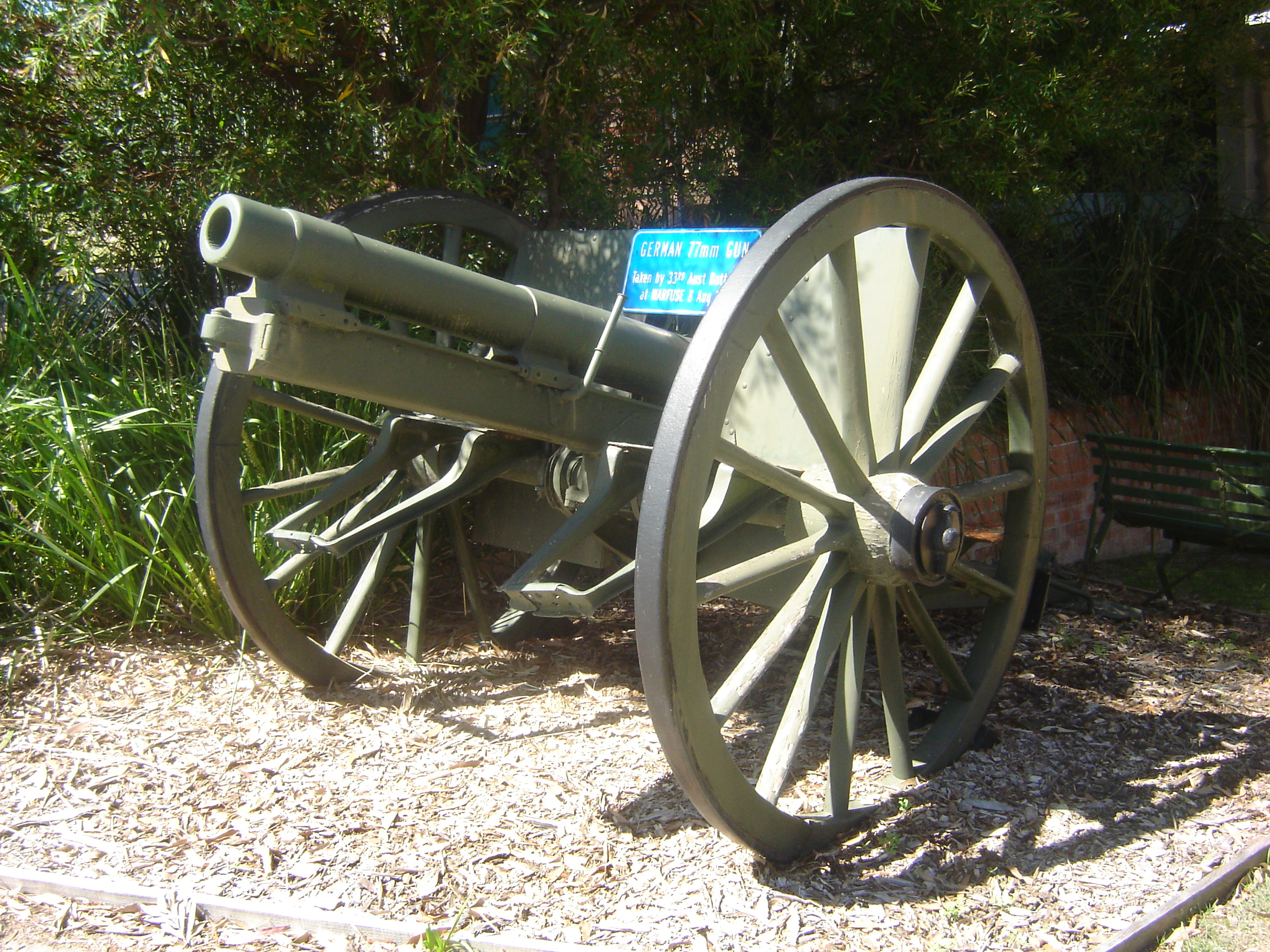
A German 7.7 cm FK 96 n.A. field gun captured during the course of the battle by the 33rd Australian Battalion

The Battle of Amiens was a significant turning point in the tempo of the war. The Germans had started the war with the Schlieffen Plan before the Race to the Sea slowed movement on the Western Front, and the war devolved into trench warfare. The German spring offensive earlier in 1918 had once again given Germany the offensive edge on the Western Front. Armoured support helped the Allies tear a hole through trench lines, weakening once-impregnable trench positions: the British Third Army, with no armoured support, had almost no effect on the line, while the Fourth, with fewer than a thousand tanks, broke deep into German territory.

The British war correspondent Philip Gibbs noted Amiens' effect on the war's tempo, saying on 27 August that "the enemy...is on the defensive" and "the initiative of attack is so completely in our hands that we are able to strike him at many different places." Gibbs also credits Amiens with a shift in troop morale, saying, "The change has been greater in the minds of men than in the taking of territory. On our side, the army seems to be buoyed up with the enormous hope of getting on with this business quickly" and that, "there is a change also in the enemy's mind. They no longer have even a dim hope of victory on this western front. All they hope for now is to defend themselves long enough to gain peace by negotiation."

== In popular culture ==
On the night of August 8–9, 1918, as Doughboys from the 33rd U.S. Division were beginning their assault on Chipilly Ridge, American war poet Lt. John Allan Wyeth and Lieut. Thomas J. Cochrane were assigned to deliver sealed orders from Division HQ at Molliens-au-Bois to the Field Headquarters of all three battalions engaged in the attack. The location of each battalion was unknown, but they were believed to be along the northern bank of the Somme, near the village of Sailly-le-Sec. In his 1928 sonnet sequence This Man's Army, Wyeth described the mission in detail in his six interlinked "Chipilly Ridge sonnets."

According to Bradley J. Omanson, "Lt. Wyeth, as it happened, was a cultured man, a recent Princeton graduate in languages and literature, and he rendered his experiences of that night into an accomplished, highly original cycle of six linked sonnets – part of a much longer cycle of over fifty sonnets which covered the entirety of his service in the war. But this self-contained six-sonnet sequence in particular – describing one soldier's stumblings through the metaphoric valley of death – delves most memorably into the nature of war."

The Battle of Amiens was featured in Battlefield 1 as a map for the game's modes, such as Conquest, Rush, and Team Deathmatch. It is also featured in the game's operation of Kaiserschlacht.

The Battle of Amiens is featured as a pivotal point in season 2, episode 5 of the British period drama Downton Abbey, resulting in Mathew Crawley being severely injured and in William Mason's ultimate death.

== Decorations ==
- Eight Canadians received the Victoria Cross for actions during the Battle of Amiens: Private John Croak, Corporal Harry Miner, Corporal Herman Good, Corporal Frederick Coppins, Lance Corporal Alexander Picton Brereton, Sgt Raphael Zengel, Lieutenant James Edward Tait and Lieutenant Jean Brillant.
- Corporal Jake Allex (1887–1959) of the 33rd U.S. Infantry Division was awarded the Medal of Honor for his actions during the capture of Chipilly Ridge.
- 12 Aug 1918 Monash was made a Knight Commander of the Order of the Bath by King George V in the field. The first time a British monarch had done this in 200 years.
- Australian Alfred Gaby earned himself a Victoria's Cross for his actions on 08 Aug 1918. Albert was acting as commander when the advance was checked by a large German force about 40 yards beyond the wire. Gaby found a gap and approached the strong point under heavy machine gun and rifle fire. He emptied his revolver into the garrison, drove the crews from their guns, and captured 50 prisoners and four machine guns. Three days later, he was killed by sniper fire in Lihons while leading his men.
