= Molliens-au-Bois =

- Commune
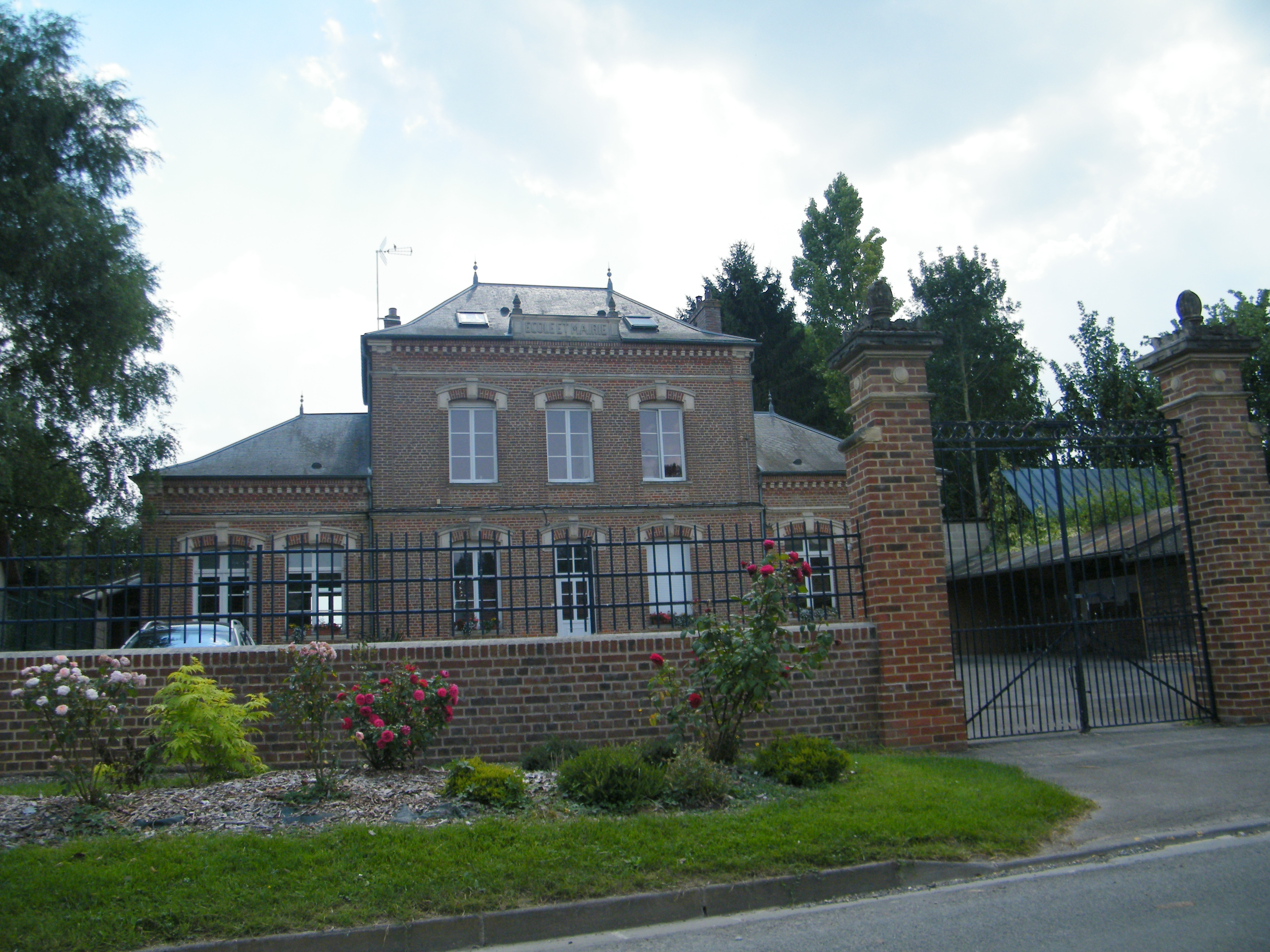
- The town hall and school in Molliens-au-Bois
- Location of Molliens-au-Bois
- Location within France Location within Hauts-de-France
- Coordinates: 49°59′20″N 2°23′10″E
- Country: France
- Region: Hauts-de-France
- Department: Somme
- Arrondissement: Amiens
- Canton: Corbie
- Intercommunality: CC Territoire Nord Picardie

Government
  - Mayor (2020–2026): Frédéric Avisse
- Area^{1}: 7.28 km^{2} (2.81 sq mi)
- Elevation: 105 m (344 ft)
- Highest elevation: 129 m (423 ft)
- Lowest elevation: 62 m (203 ft)
- Population (2023): 349
  - Density: 47.9/km^{2} (124/sq mi)
- Time zone: UTC+01:00 (CET)
  - Summer (DST): UTC+02:00 (CEST)
- INSEE/Postal code: 80553 /80260
- ^{1} French Land Register data, which excludes lakes, ponds, glaciers > 1 km^{2} (0.386 sq mi or 247 acres) and river estuaries.

Molliens-au-Bois (French pronunciation: [mɔljɛ̃ o bwa]) is a commune in the Somme department in Hauts-de-France in northern France.

== Geography ==
The commune is situated on the D30 and D78 road junction, some 10 miles (16 km) northeast of Amiens.

== History ==
During the Battle of Amiens in August 1918, the divisional HQ of the U.S 33rd Infantry Division was set up in the chateau at Molliens-au-Bois. During that period, King George V went to the castle and awarded medals to General Pershing and other troops. General Bell was the C.O of the division.

On the night of August 8–9, 1918, as three Battalions of Doughboys from the 33rd U.S. Division were joining the Allied offensive during the Battle of Amiens, American war poet Lieut. John Allan Wyeth and Lieut. Thomas J. Cochrane were assigned to deliver sealed orders from Division HQ at Molliens-au-Bois to the Field Headquarters of all three Battalions engaged in the attack. The location of each Battalion was unknown, but they were believed to be along the northern bank of the Somme River, near the village of Sailly-le-Sec. Wyeth would later describe the mission in detail in his six interlinked "Chipilly Ridge sonnets."

== Population ==
Historical population
Year	Pop.	±% p.a.
1968	192	—
1975	208	+1.15%
1982	195	−0.92%
1990	315	+6.18%
1999	326	+0.38%
2007	334	+0.30%
2012	332	−0.12%
2017	322	−0.61%
2023	349	+1.35%
Source: INSEE

== See also ==
- Communes of the Somme department
