= John Allan Wyeth =

American surgeon (1845–1922)

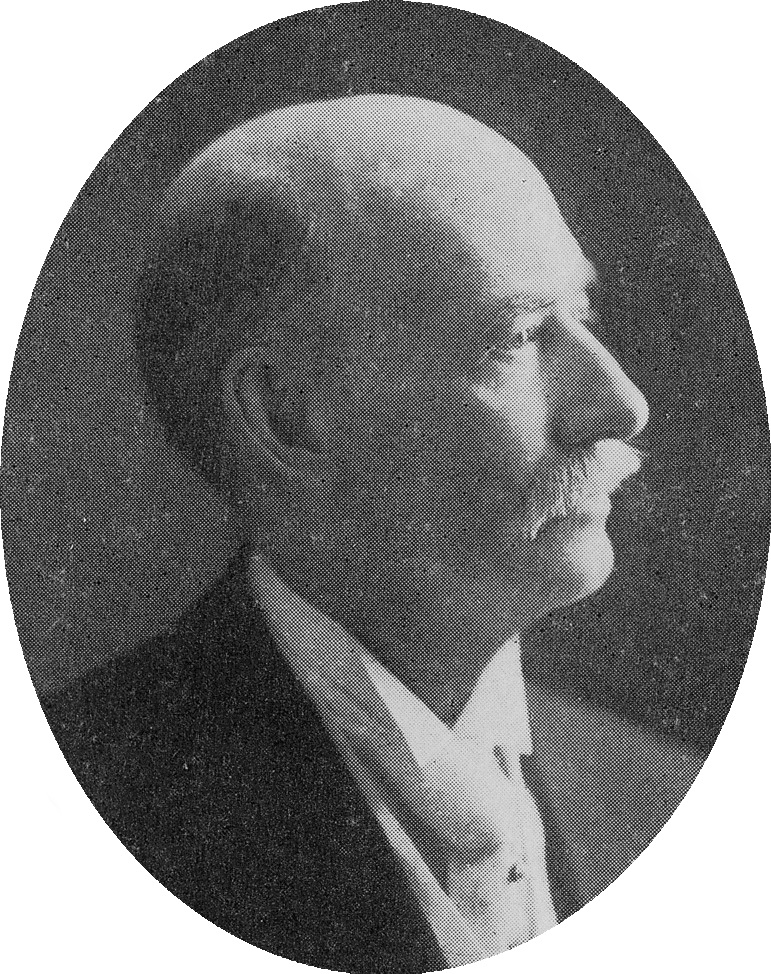
- Born: May 26, 1845; Guntersville, Alabama, U.S.
- Died: May 22, 1922 (aged 76)
- Resting place: Green-Wood Cemetery
- Education: La Grange Military Academy; University of Louisville School of Medicine
- Spouses: Florence Nightingale Sims (m. 1886; died 1915); Marguerite Chalifoux (m. 1918)
- Children: 3, including Marion Sims Wyeth and John Allan Wyeth
- Relatives: J. Marion Sims (father-in-law)

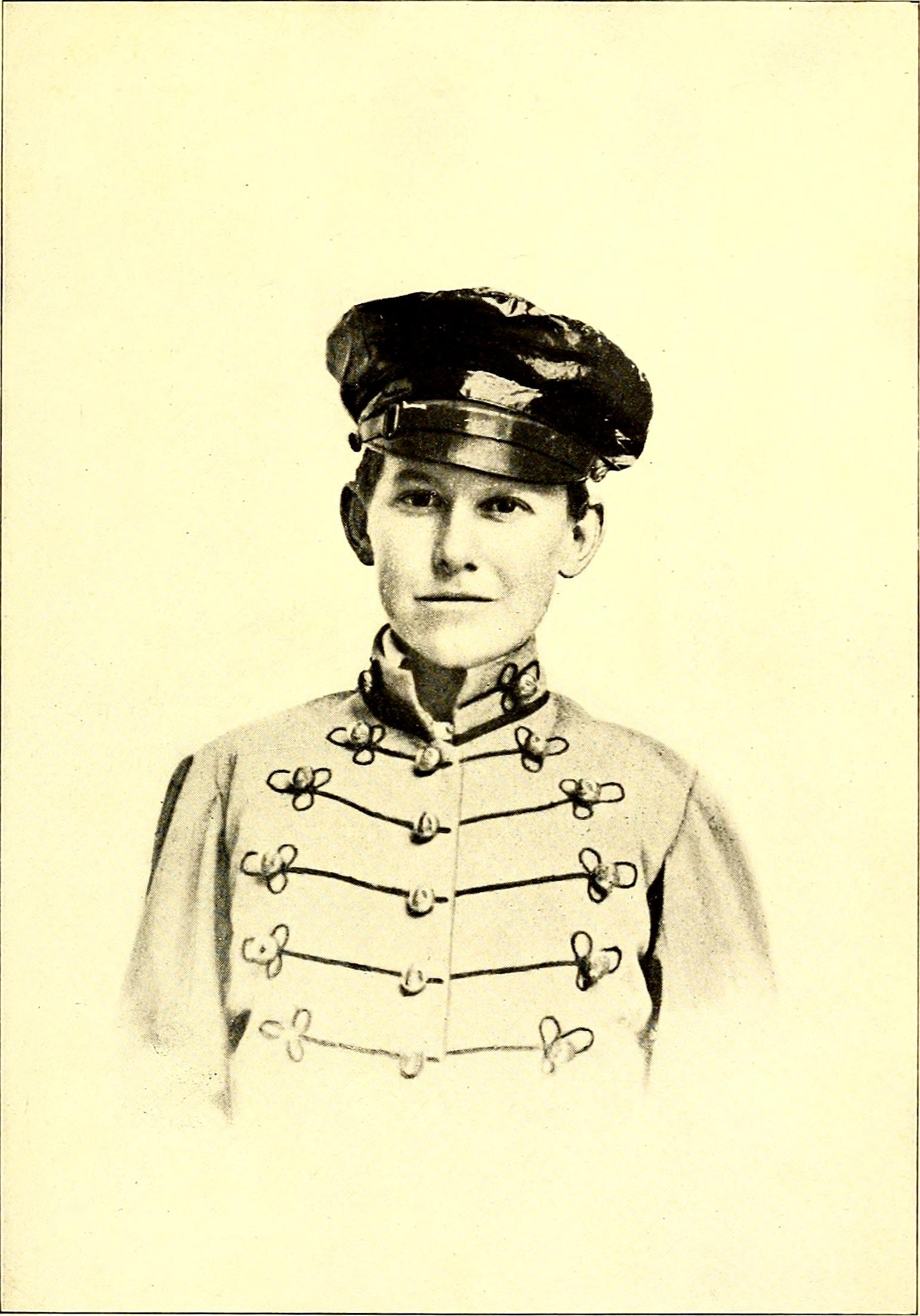
John Wyeth in the Civil War

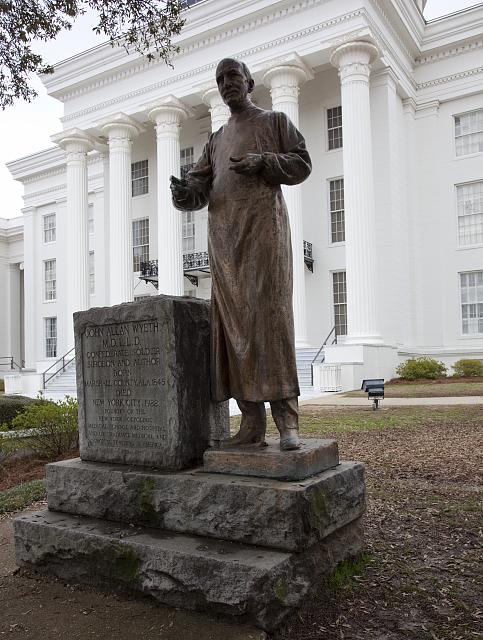
Statue of John Wyeth on the grounds of the Alabama State Capitol in Montgomery, Alabama.

John Allan Wyeth (May 26, 1845 – May 22, 1922) was an American Confederate veteran and surgeon. Born and raised on a Southern plantation in Alabama, he served in the Confederate States Army and completed his medical studies in New York City and Europe. He became a surgeon in New York City, where he founded the New York Polyclinic Graduate Medical School and Hospital, a medical school. He served as the president of the American Medical Association in 1902. He was the author of a biography of Confederate General Nathan Bedford Forrest. He was a proponent of the annexation of Mexico by the United States.

== Early life ==
John Allan Wyeth was born on May 26, 1845, in Guntersville, Alabama. His father, Louis Wyeth, was a lawyer who founded the city of Guntersville in 1848 and later served in the Alabama state legislature. His mother, Euphemia Allan, was the daughter of John Allan, a Presbyterian minister who was opposed to slavery. On his paternal side, Wyeth was related to George Wythe, a Virginia lawyer who was also opposed to slavery. He grew up on a Southern plantation.

Wyeth attended La Grange Military Academy, a defunct military academy in Colbert County, Alabama, from the age of 15 to 17. During the American Civil War of 1861–1865, he served in the Confederate States Army. He participated in Morgan's Raid under Brigadier-General John Hunt Morgan, from 1862 to 1863. He joined the 4th Regiment Alabama Cavalry under General Joseph Wheeler, and served in the Battle of Chickamauga of 1863. He was captured by Union forces and jailed at the Camp Morton in Indianapolis,from October 1863 to February 1865.

After the war, Wyeth attended the University of Louisville School of Medicine, graduating in 1869. He also studied at the Bellevue Hospital Medical College from 1872 to 1873, when he received another medical degree. Shortly after, Wyeth joined the staff at the Bellevue Hospital. After reading French and German medical journals, he completed his medical studies by going to Europe, where he was trained as a surgeon by J. Marion Sims. He also met "leading physicians and surgeons in Paris, London, Berlin, and Vienna."

== Career ==
Wyeth became a surgeon at St. Elizabeths Hospital and Mount Sinai Hospital in New York City in 1880. A year later, in 1881, he founded the New York Polyclinic Graduate Medical School and Hospital. Prominent students included William James Mayo and Charles Horace Mayo. By 1918, the Polyclinic Graduate Medical School merged with the Columbia University College of Physicians and Surgeons.

Wyeth served as the president of the American Medical Association in 1902. He also served as the president of the New York Academy of Medicine in 1906 and 1908.

Wyeth wrote his memoir, entitled With Sabre and Scalpel: The Autobiography of a Soldier and Surgeon. He also wrote a memoir of Confederate General Nathan Bedford Forrest, entitled That Devil Forrest: Life of General Nathan Bedford Forrest. The book was reviewed by The American Historical Review, who called it "valuable and unusually interesting," concluding, "Dr. Wyeth's style is attractive, and his narrative, notwithstanding the amplitude of detail and incident, is extremely clear." Additionally, Wyeth wrote an article published in the Confederate Veteran.

In a 1915 article published in the North American Review, Wyeth suggested Mexico was "a disgrace to civilization," partly due to widespread addiction to pulque and to a "disregard" for the institution of marriage. He suggested:

The hopelessness of the Mexican situation lies chiefly in the impossibility, under conditions which have long existed, of bringing the people together in a common understanding of each other; and, in the opinion of the writer, nothing but intervention on our part, and the establishment of a stable government, by force, if necessary, can accomplish this. [...] There can be no solution of this serious problem without intervention, and intervention without annexation would only prolong a cruel experiment. As plainly as the writing on the wall, our national destiny is impelling us to the occupation of Mexico; not for conquest, not for commercial gain, but for the benefit of her unfortunate people should we establish and insure forever in that unhappy land the order of civilization.

— John Allan Wyeth, North American Review (July 1915)

== Personal life ==
Wyeth married Florence Nightingale Sims, the daughter of surgeon J. Marion Sims, on August 10, 1886. They had two sons and one daughter. One of their sons, Marion Sims Wyeth, became an architect who designed many mansions in Florida. Another son, John Allan Wyeth Jr., was a poet. After his first wife died, Wyeth married Marguerite Chalifoux.

Wyeth was a Christian. He played the banjo, which he learned as a child from a slave on his family plantation.

== Death and legacy ==
Wyeth died of a heart attack on May 22, 1922. He was buried at the Green-Wood Cemetery in Brooklyn, New York.

Wyeth was inducted into the Alabama Hall of Fame in 1954. His statue was added to the Alabama State Capitol in Montgomery, Alabama. Meanwhile, the New York Polyclinic Graduate Medical School and Hospital closed down in 1975.
