= You're in the Army Now (song) =

Song
- Written: 1917
- Published: August 27, 1917 Tell Taylor, Inc., Chicago
- Composer: Isham Jones
- Lyricists: Tell Taylor; Ole Olsen

Sheet music of the song

"You're in the Army Now" also known as "We're in the Army Now" is an American song written in 1917 by Isham Jones. Lyrics were written by Tell Taylor and Ole Olsen. The notes of the melody are intended to resemble those of a U.S. Army bugle call.

== In popular culture ==
The piece of music has appeared in several movies and cartoons about the US Army from The Big Parade to The Dirty Dozen to The Draft Horse to Rio Grande with the lyrics providing titles for two 1941 army comedies You're in the Army Now and You'll Never Get Rich. The original title of the television series The Phil Silvers Show was You'll Never Get Rich.

The song is also referenced by war poet John Allan Wyeth in his 1928 poetry collection This Man's Army: A War in Fifty-Odd Sonnets. The collection recalls Wyeth's service with the American Expeditionary Forces in France during the First World War.

== Lyrics ==
There are at least two versions of the lyrics with "You'll never get rich, you son of a bitch" often replaced with "You'll never get rich by digging a ditch".
