= Huppy =

- Commune
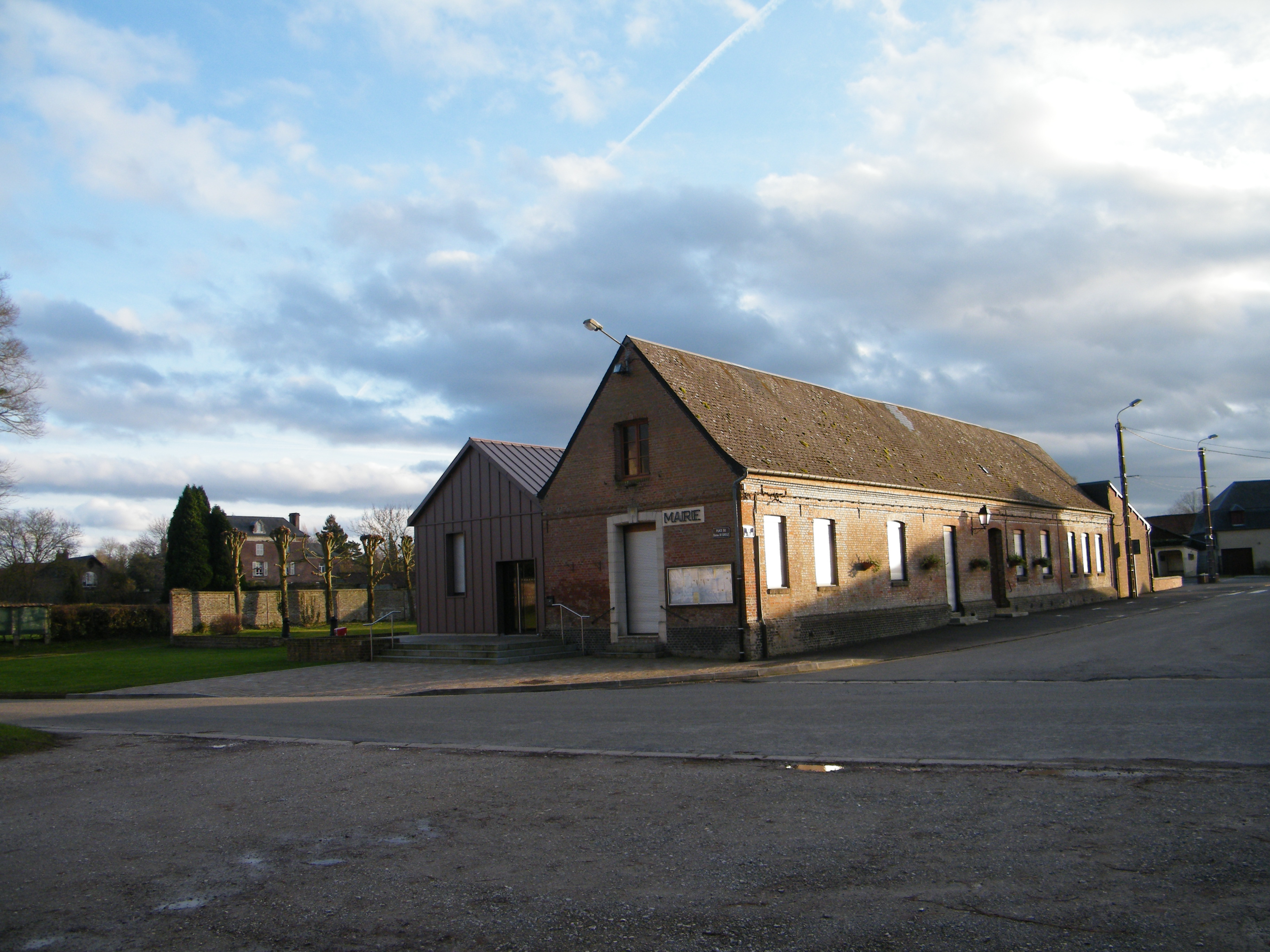
- The town hall in Huppy

- Coat of arms
- Location of Huppy
- Location within France Location within Hauts-de-France
- Coordinates: 50°01′35″N 1°46′01″E
- Country: France
- Region: Hauts-de-France
- Department: Somme
- Arrondissement: Abbeville
- Canton: Gamaches
- Intercommunality: CA Baie de Somme

Government
  - Mayor (2020–2026): Aymerick Coeuilte
- Area^{1}: 10.81 km^{2} (4.17 sq mi)
- Elevation: 98 m (322 ft)
- Highest elevation: 113 m (371 ft)
- Lowest elevation: 60 m (200 ft)
- Population (2023): 749
  - Density: 69.3/km^{2} (179/sq mi)
- Time zone: UTC+01:00 (CET)
  - Summer (DST): UTC+02:00 (CEST)
- INSEE/Postal code: 80446 /80140
- ^{1} French Land Register data, which excludes lakes, ponds, glaciers > 1 km^{2} (0.386 sq mi or 247 acres) and river estuaries.

Huppy (French pronunciation: [ypi]) is a commune in the Somme department in Hauts-de-France in northern France.

== Geography ==
Huppy is situated at the junction of the D25 and D13 roads, some 7 miles (11 km) south-southwest of Abbeville.

The A28 autoroute is less than 1 mile (2 km) away. Àt 100 metres altitude on the limestone plateau of the old region of the Vimeu. The land is fertile and well-watered. Electricity generating turbines now stand in the fields where once wind-mills stood.

== Places of interest ==
- The Château

In 1940, during World War II, the château of Huppy became the headquarters of General Charles de Gaulle, commanding officer (as a colonel) of the 4th Division de Cuirassé, during the battle of Abbeville (28 – 31 May).
A bust in memorial to the General is placed in the village square.
A commemorative monument about the battle has been built at the western entrance to the village.

== Population ==
Historical population

Year	Pop.	±% p.a.
1793	875	—
1800	726	−2.63%
1806	904	+3.72%
1821	996	+0.65%
1831	899	−1.02%
1836	960	+1.32%
1841	1,028	+1.38%
1846	1,030	+0.04%
1851	1,075	+0.86%
1856	1,054	−0.39%
1861	1,059	+0.09%
1866	1,133	+1.36%
1872	1,119	−0.21%
1876	1,096	−0.52%
1881	1,071	−0.46%
1886	1,047	−0.45%
1891	1,011	−0.70%
1896	1,004	−0.14%
1901	972	−0.65%

Year	Pop.	±% p.a.
1906	922	−1.05%
1911	867	−1.22%
1921	774	−1.13%
1926	754	−0.52%
1931	740	−0.37%
1936	701	−1.08%
1946	608	−1.41%
1954	600	−0.17%
1962	614	+0.29%
1968	631	+0.46%
1975	579	−1.22%
1982	592	+0.32%
1990	590	−0.04%
1999	694	+1.82%
2007	771	+1.32%
2012	808	+0.94%
2017	785	−0.58%
2023	749	−0.78%

Source: EHESS and INSEE (1968-2023)

== See also ==
- Communes of the Somme department
