= Doughboy =

Slang for or cultural image of American infantrymen, circa 1914-1942

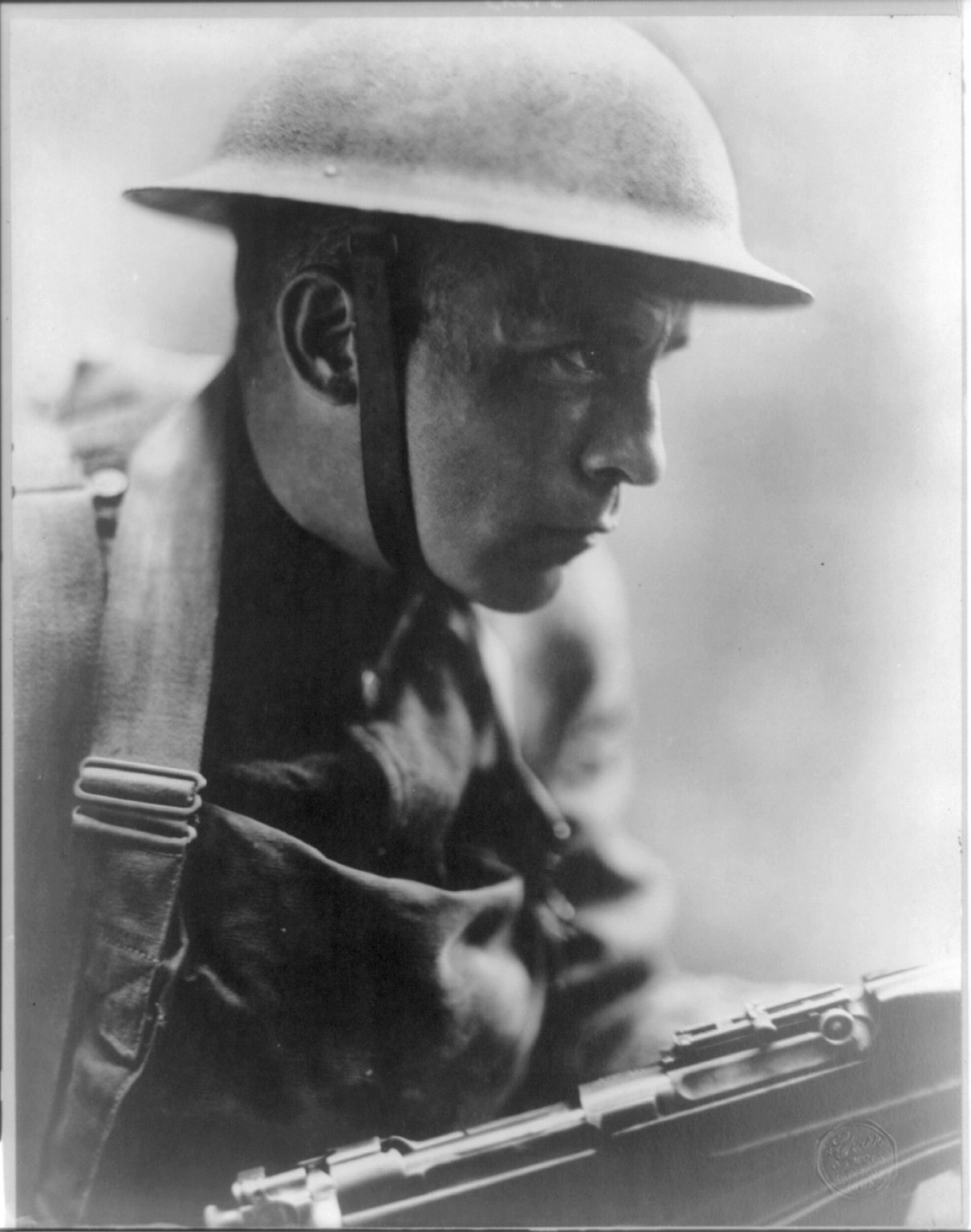
"Over the top" – close-up of a doughboy in full combat dress

"Doughboy" was a popular nickname for the American infantryman during World War I. Though the origins of the term are not certain, the nickname was still in use as of the early 1940s, when it was gradually replaced by "G.I." as the following generation enlisted in World War II.

== Background ==
=== Philology ===
The origins of the term are unclear. The word was in wide circulation a century earlier in both Britain and America, albeit with different meanings. Horatio Nelson's sailors and the Duke of Wellington's soldiers in Spain, for instance, were both familiar with fried flour dumplings called "doughboys", the precursor of the modern doughnut. Independently, in the United States, the term had come to be applied to bakers' young apprentices, i.e., "dough-boys". In Moby-Dick (1851), Herman Melville nicknamed the timorous cabin steward "Doughboy".

=== Average age ===
Infantrymen recruited for World War I were mostly teenagers: 'merely kids who didn't look to be a day over sixteen'. The average age of a "doughboy" in World War I was less than 25 years old. Fifty-seven percent of infantrymen were under the age of 25, with some enlisting as young as seventeen.

== History ==
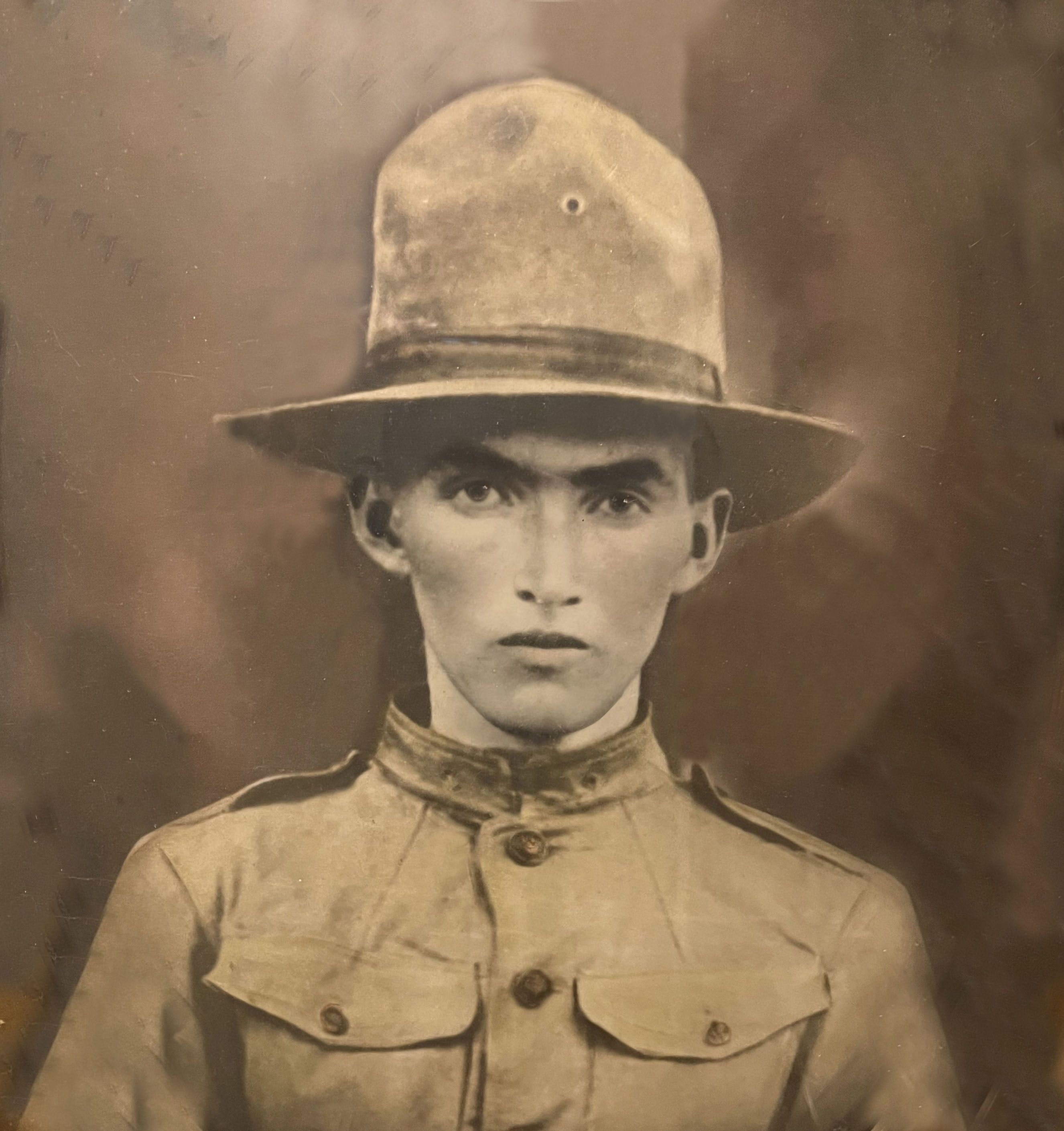
World War I colorized photo of a very young Doughboy

Doughboy as applied to the infantry of the U.S. Army first appears in accounts of the Mexican–American War of 1846–1848, without any precedent that can be documented. A number of theories have been put forward to explain this usage:

- Cavalrymen used the term to deride foot soldiers, because the brass buttons on their uniforms looked like the flour dumplings or dough cakes called "doughboys", or because of the flour or pipe clay which the soldiers used to polish their white belts.
- Observers noticed U.S. infantry forces were constantly covered with chalky dust from marching through the dry terrain of northern Mexico, giving the men the appearance of unbaked dough or the mud bricks of the area known as adobe, with "adobe" transformed to 'dobies' and then further into "doughboy".
- The soldiers' method of cooking field rations of the 1840s and 1850s into doughy flour-and-rice concoctions baked in the ashes of a camp fire. This does not explain why only infantrymen received the appellation.

One explanation offered for the usage of the term in World War I is that female Salvation Army volunteers went to France to cook millions of doughnuts and bring them to the troops on the front line, although this explanation ignores the usage of the term in the earlier war. One jocular explanation for the term's origin was that, in World War I, the doughboys were "kneaded" in 1914 but did not rise until 1917.

=== Postwar ===
Examples from the Interwar and WW2 eras include the 1942 song "Johnny Doughboy Found a Rose in Ireland", recorded by Dennis Day, Kenny Baker, and Kay Kyser, among others, the 1942 musical film Johnny Doughboy, and the character "Johnny Doughboy" in Military Comics.

The term "doughboy" continued to be used by the U.S. Army Infantry Branch into the 1920s to describe infantrymen. Appearing in the U.S. Army Infantry School class books stating "the title "doughboy" is Infantry property and belongs of right to no other branch, all of which have their own popular nicknames. We are proud of it, and justly resent its misuse." The term was used during the interwar period but by World War II was replaced by the term "G.I.".

Today the "Doughboy Award" (Order of Saint Maurice) is presented by the Army Infantry Branch "to recognize an individual for outstanding contributions to the United States Army Infantry. The award is presented on behalf of all Infantrymen past and present".

== Monuments and memorials ==
A popular mass-produced sculpture of the 1920s called the Spirit of the American Doughboy shows a U.S. soldier in World War I uniform.

In September 2024, the National World War I Memorial unveiled a sculpture called A Soldier's Journey which depicts a single “doughboy” as he leaves home, witnesses death and destruction on the front lines and makes his way back.

== See also ==
- American entry into World War I
- Digger – equivalent for Australian and New Zealand soldiers, originated in World War I
- Poilu – equivalent term for French soldiers of World War I
- Tommy Atkins – equivalent term for British soldiers of World War I
