= Joe Agius (architect) =

Australian architect

Joe Agius is an Australian architect and director of Cox Architecture since 2005. He has worked in a variety of sectors, including urban and master planning, education, sports, culture and research. He has worked across Australia and internationally. His projects include the Sir John Monash Centre, Australian Film, Television and Radio School, NeuRA Research Centre and The Darling. From 2013 to 2014 he was Chapter President of the Australian Institute of Architects, and is a Life Fellow of the Australian Institute of Architects.

== Education ==
Agius completed a Bachelor of Architecture, graduating with first class honours from the University of New South Wales in 1992. He received the 'most outstanding graduate' AIA award.

== Major Works ==
| Completed | Project name | Location | Awards | Notes |
|---|---|---|---|---|
| 2000 | Sydney Showground Stadium | Sydney Olympic Park | | |
| 2000 | National Wine Centre | North Terrace, Adelaide, South Australia | Award of Merit for New Build, 2002 SA AIA Awards | With Grieve Gillet. |
| 2007 | Qingdao Olympic Sailing Facilities and athlete accommodation | Qingdao, Shandong province | | |
| 2008 | Australian Film, Television and Radio School (AFTRS) | The Entertainment Quarter, Moore Park | State Commendation for Commercial Architecture 2010 NSW AIA Awards | |
| 2010 | University of Sydney 2020 Master plan | Camperdown and Darlington, NSW | | |
| 2011 | The Darling Hotel | Pyrmont, New South Wales | Best New Hotel Construction and Design Asia-Pacific International Hotel Awards Best New Hotel Construction and Design 2012-2013 International Hotel Awards | |
| 2012 | Adelaide Studios | Adelaide, South AustraliaSouth Australian Film Corporation | Award for Commercial Architecture 2012 National AIA Awards | |
| 2013 | Neuroscience Research Australia (NeuRA) | Randwick, NSW | | |
| 2014 | Sustainable Buildings Research Facility | University of Wollongong | Milo Dunphy Award for Sustainable Architecture | |
| 2014 | Macquarie University Master Plan | Macquarie University | | |
| 2018 | Sir John Monash Centre | Villers-Bretonneux, Hauts-de-France | Named Award for Heritage Architecture and Public Architecture Award 2021 AIA International Chapter Awards People's Choice Award 2021 AIA International Chapter Awards International Architecture Awards 2019 Chicago Athenaeum | With Williams, Abrahams and Lampros. |
| 2019 | Australian Museum Project Discover | | Heritage Architecture Award and Public Architecture Award, 2021 National Architecture Awards Greenway Award Heritage Architecture, 2021 NSW Architecture Medallion, 2021 | With Neeson Murcutt + Neille. |
| 2022 | University of Sydney Faculty of Engineering | University of Sydney | | |
