= Patrick Simon (politician) =

French politician (1955–2020)

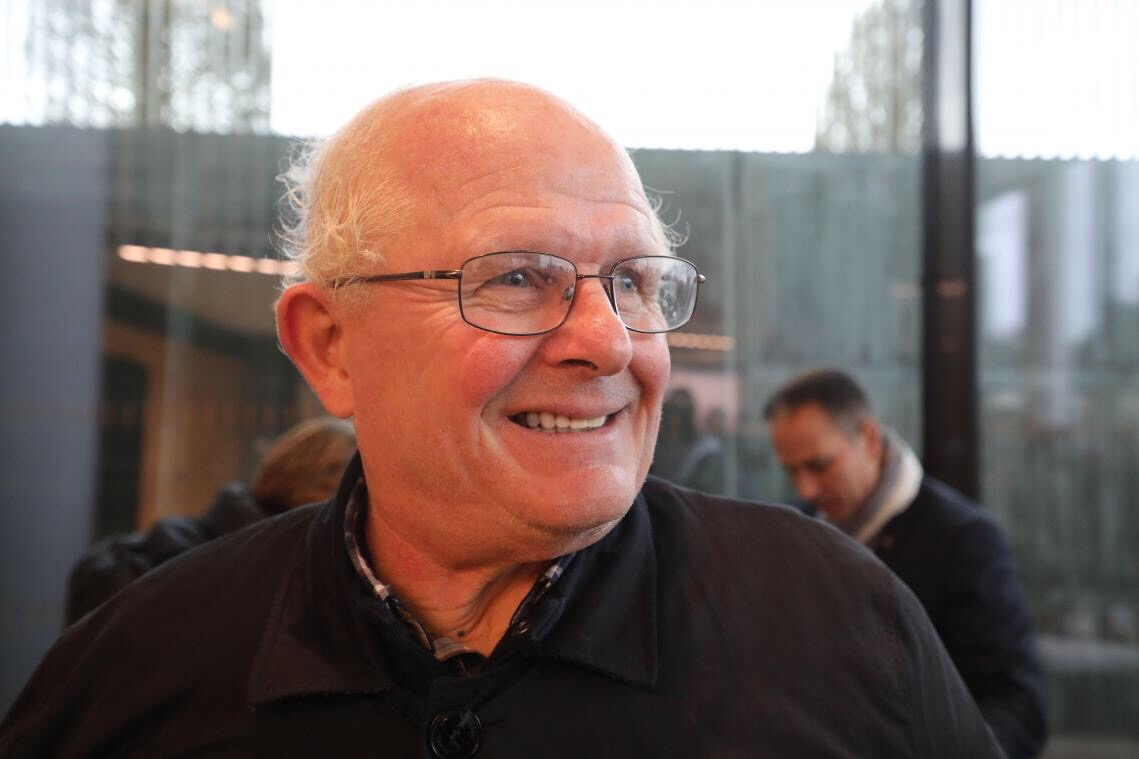

Mayor of Villers-Bretonneux
- In office 2008 – 13 May 2020
- Preceded by: Hubert Lelieur
- Succeeded by: Didier Dinouard

Personal details
- Born: 12 June 1955 Sedan, France
- Died: 13 May 2020 (age 64) Amiens, France
- Spouse: Catherine Simon
- Profession: Dentist; Politician

Patrick Simon, AO, (12 June 1955 – 13 May 2020) was a French politician, dentist, Mayor of Villers-Bretonneux from 2008 until 2020, and strong proponent of Australia–France relations. Simon served as Mayor of Villers-Bretonneux for two terms from 2008 until his death in 2020 from COVID-19 during the COVID-19 pandemic in France. In April 1918, during World War I, Villers-Bretonneux was liberated from German occupation by the First Australian Imperial Force at the cost of an estimated 1,300 Australian lives. Following the war, donations from the state of Victoria and Victorians helped to rebuild the village. Simon became a major supporter of relations between France, Villers-Bretonneux, and Australia during his twelve-year tenure as mayor. Mayor Simon oversaw the renovations of the Franco-Australian First World War Museum in Villers-Bretonneux, helped to establish the Sir John Monash Centre in France in 2018, and presided over Villers-Bretonneux's annual Anzac Day commemoration for twelve years.

Simon was awarded an honorary Order of Australia (AO) in 2015 for his advocacy on behalf of Australian-Franco relations, while the Australian press dubbed him "Australia's best friend in France." Most recently, Mayor Simon organized of a fundraiser for victims of the 2019–20 Australian bushfire season which raised approximately $37,000 AUD from Villers-Bretonneux's residents and school students by the end of February 2020.

== Biography ==
Simon was a dentist by profession. His political career spanned more than 37 years. He first served as a municipal councilor for two terms and then two more terms as deputy. In 2008, Simon was elected Mayor of Villers-Bretonneux to succeed outgoing Mayor Hubert Lelieur. Simon was re-elected to a second term in 2014. He was reportedly reluctant to seek a third mayoral term in 2020, but ultimately decided to run for another term after his retirement from dentistry in 2019. He came in third place in the first round of the Villers-Bretonneux mayoral election on March 15, 2020. Simon continued to serve as mayor until his death in office from COVID-19 in May 2020.

In 2015, Simon was awarded the honorary Officer of the Order of Australia (AO) for "distinguished service to Australian-French relations." On April 25, 2018, welcomed French Prime Minister Edouard Philippe and Australian Prime Minister Malcolm Turnbull to Villers-Bretonneux for the grand opening of the Sir John Monash Centre, which was dedicated to the Australian military and its soldiers during World War I.

Dr. Patrick Simon contracted COVID-19 during the COVID-19 pandemic in France in late March 2020 and was placed in intensive care for more than fifty days. He was initially admitted to a hospital in Rang-du-Fliers, but was transferred to CHU d'Amiens hospital in Amiens. Simon's condition initially stabilized in April, but rapidly deteriorated in May 2020.

Patrick Simon died at CHU d'Amiens hospital in Amiens on 13 May 2020, at the age of 63 following a seven-week illness with COVID-19.

The Australian Ambassador to France, Brendan Berne, ordered flags at the embassy in Paris to be flown at half staff in Simon's honor. The small town of Robinvale, Victoria, which is twinned with Villers-Bretonneux, paid tribute to Simon, saying, "We extend our condolences to Mr Simon's family, friends, the Villers-Bretonneux community, and the Robinvale-Villers Bretonneux Association members during this sad time." Robinvale was named after Lieutenant Robin Cuttle, who was killed in action in Caix during the Second Battle of Villers-Bretonneux in 1918. Simon had visited Robinvale several times, most recently in October 2019, and developed close personal and professional relationships with the town's leaders.

The Sydney Morning Herald called Simon "Australia's staunchest supporter in France," while Seven News praised him as "a great friend of Australia, who worked tirelessly to honor the sacrifice of ANZAC."
