= Rosières station =

French railway station

Rosières

General information
- Coordinates: 49°49′21″N 2°42′40″E
- Owner: RFF/SNCF
- Line: Amiens–Laon railway
- Platforms: 2
- Tracks: 2

Construction
- Accessible: Rosières-en-Santerre

Other information
- Station code: 87313460

Services
Preceding station	TER Hauts-de-France	Following station
Marcelcave towards Amiens	Proxi P20	Chaulnes towards Laon

Other services
Preceding station	Disused railways	Following station
Harbonnières	Montdidier–Fricourt line Metre gauge	Rosières-Vrely
Location

Rosières is a railway station located in the commune of Rosières-en-Santerre in the Somme department, France. The station is served by TER Hauts-de-France trains from Amiens to Laon.

== History ==
The station was destroyed during the battles of the First World War, and it was rebuilt between the two world wars.

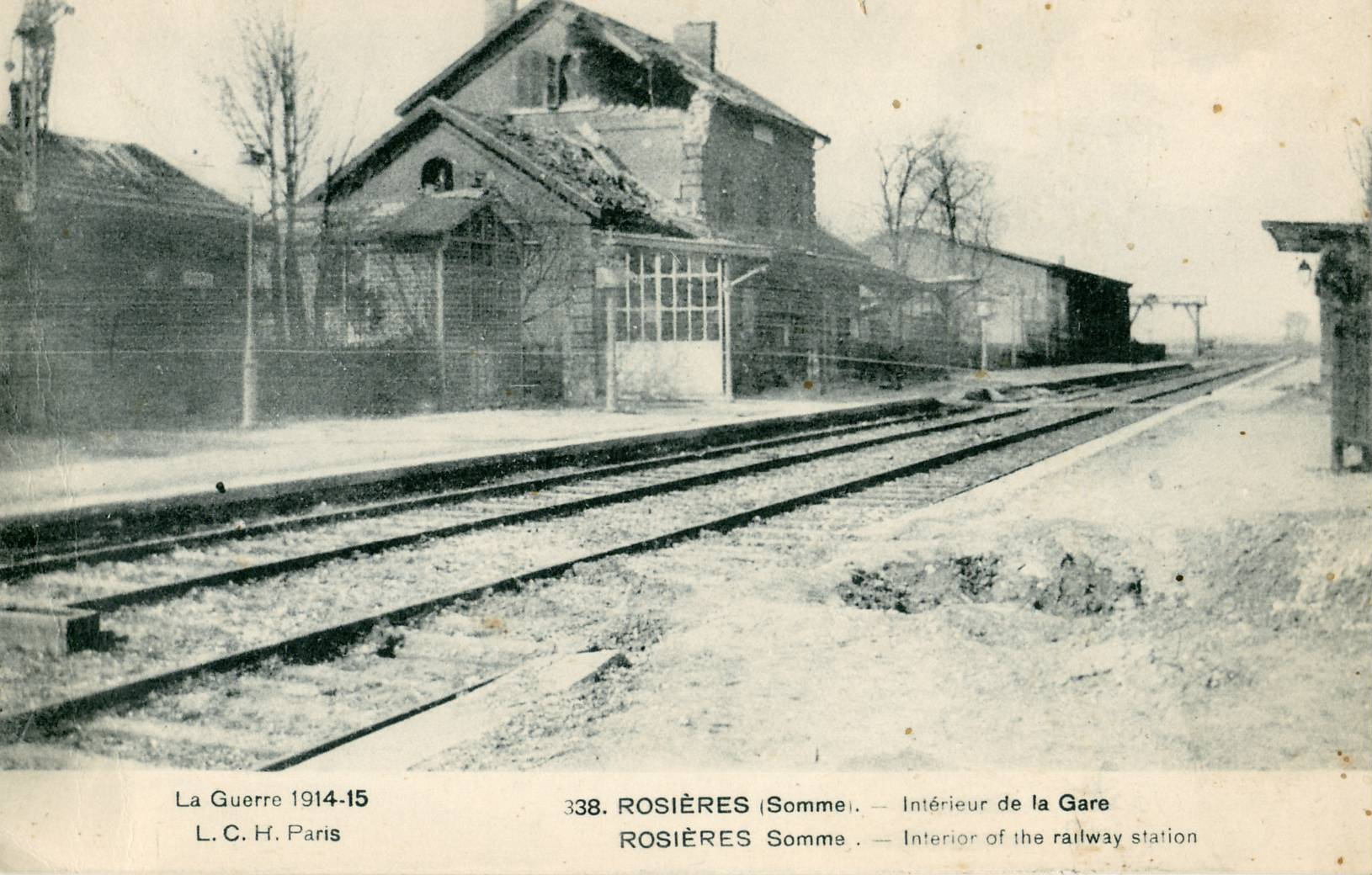
Damage to the station during World War I

The station used to be connected with Montdidier and Albert by secondary railway lines.

== See also ==
- List of SNCF stations in Hauts-de-France
