= Villers-Bretonneux Australian National Memorial =

WWI CWGC war memorial in Somme, France

Australian National Memorial, Villers-Bretonneux
- Commonwealth War Graves Commission
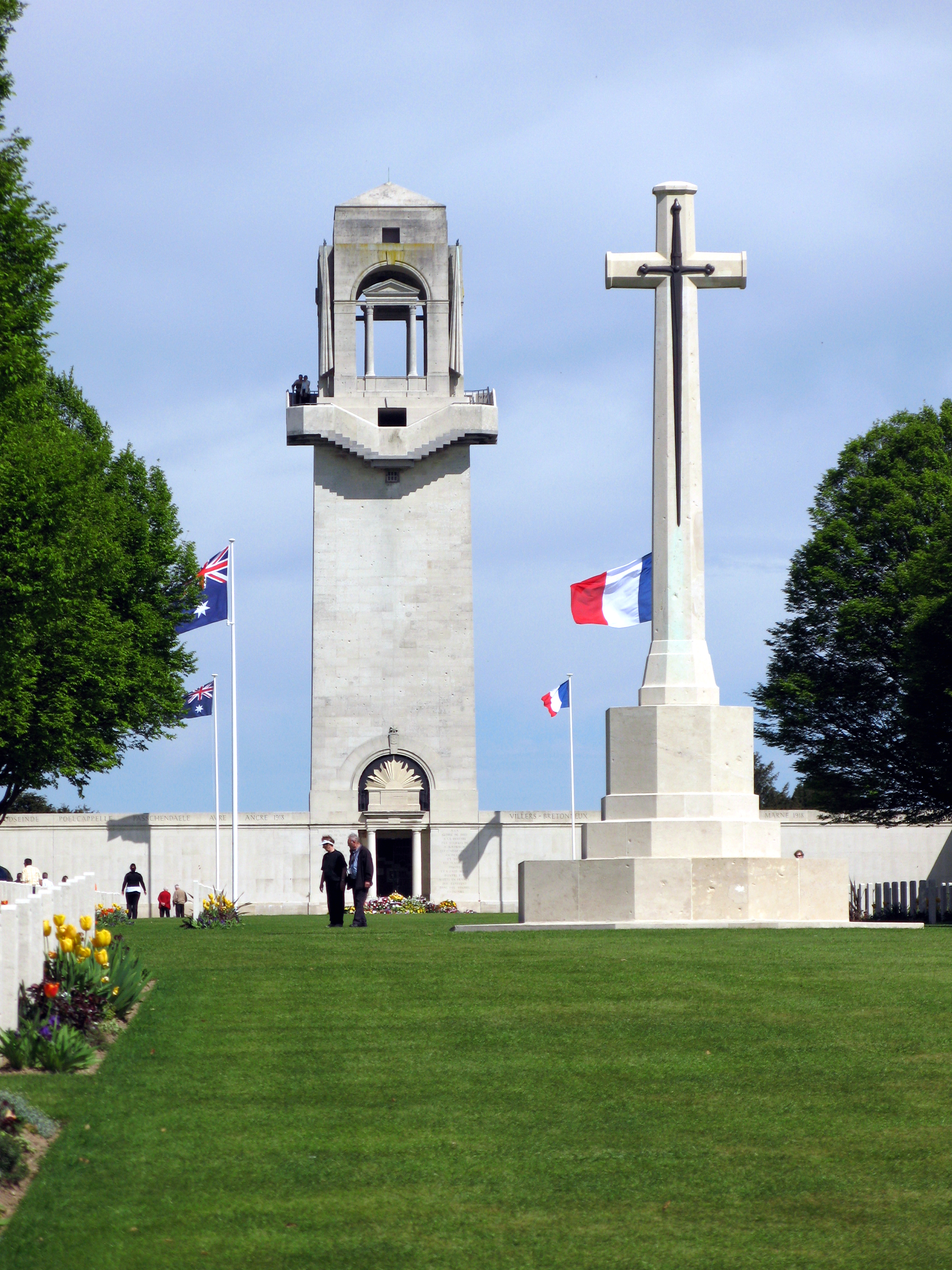
- View of the memorial tower (left) and Cross of Sacrifice (right)
- For Australian Imperial Force
- Unveiled: 22 July 1938
- Location: 49°53′12.76″N 02°30′45.97″E France
- Designed by: Sir Edwin Lutyens
- To the Glory of God and in memory of the Australian Imperial Force in France and Flanders 1916–1918 and of eleven thousand who fell in France and have no known grave

UNESCO World Heritage Site
- Official name: Funerary and memory sites of the First World War (Western Front)
- Type: Cultural
- Criteria: i, ii, vi
- Designated: 2023 (45th session)
- Reference no.: 1567-SE09

The Australian National Memorial, Villers-Bretonneux is the main memorial to Australian military personnel killed on the Western Front during World War I. It is located on the Route Villiers-Bretonneux (D 23), between the towns of Fouilloy and Villers-Bretonneux, in the Somme département, France. The memorial lists 10,773 names of soldiers of the Australian Imperial Force with no known grave who were killed between 1916, when Australian forces arrived in France and Belgium, and the end of the war. The location was chosen to commemorate the role played by Australian soldiers in the Second Battle of Villers-Bretonneux (24–27 April 1918).

Designed by Sir Edwin Lutyens, the memorial consists of a tower within the Villers-Bretonneux Military Cemetery, which also includes a Cross of Sacrifice. The tower is surrounded by walls and panels on which the names of the missing dead are listed. The main inscription is in both French and English, on either side of the entrance to the tower. The memorial and cemetery are maintained by the Commonwealth War Graves Commission.

== History of the memorial ==
Following the war, the commander of the Australian Corps, Lieutenant General Sir Talbot Hobbs chose the sites of several Australian memorials in Europe and proposed that a memorial to all of the Australian dead on the Western Front be built in France, in the Villers-Bretonneux area. The proposal was approved by the Australian government – still led by wartime Prime Minister Billy Hughes – in 1923. A competition to design the memorial was held in 1925. It was open only to Australian veterans and their parents; their entries were required to use only stone quarried in Australia. The competition was won by the Melbourne architect William Lucas. In 1929, the French government gave its approval to the project.

The Scullin government suspended the project in 1930, due to the Great Depression and the projected cost, as well as dissatisfaction with aesthetic elements of Lucas's design. Following a 1935 visit to Australia by the head of the Imperial War Graves Commission, Sir Fabian Ware, a cheaper design was sought, using French stone, from Sir Edwin Lutyens.

Construction of the memorial took place in 1936 and 1937. It was unveiled on 22 July 1938 by King George VI, whose words were broadcast directly to Australia. Other dignitaries present included the French President Albert Lebrun, who also gave a speech, and the Australian deputy prime minister Earle Page. Accompanying the King was his wife Queen Elizabeth, whose brother was killed at the Battle of Loos. This memorial was the last of the great memorials to the missing of World War I to be built, and the Second World War broke out just over a year after its unveiling. During the unveiling ceremony, the King closed his speech with the words: "They rest in peace, while over them all Australia's tower keeps watch and ward."

Every year on 25 April, an Anzac Day Dawn Service is conducted at the memorial by the Australian Government Department of Veterans' Affairs. The service commences at 5.30am and is followed by community services in Villers-Bretonneux and Bullecourt.

The cemetery originally included 60 hornbeam trees, planted in 1928. These were removed in 2009 as they reached the end of their lives, and were replaced by new trees as part of plans for the centenary commemorations in 2018.

The Sir John Monash Centre, an interpretive centre behind the Villers–Bretonneux Australian National Memorial, opened in April 2018.

== Notable Commemoratees ==
- Private Thomas Cooke – New Zealand-born Australian Army VC recipient.
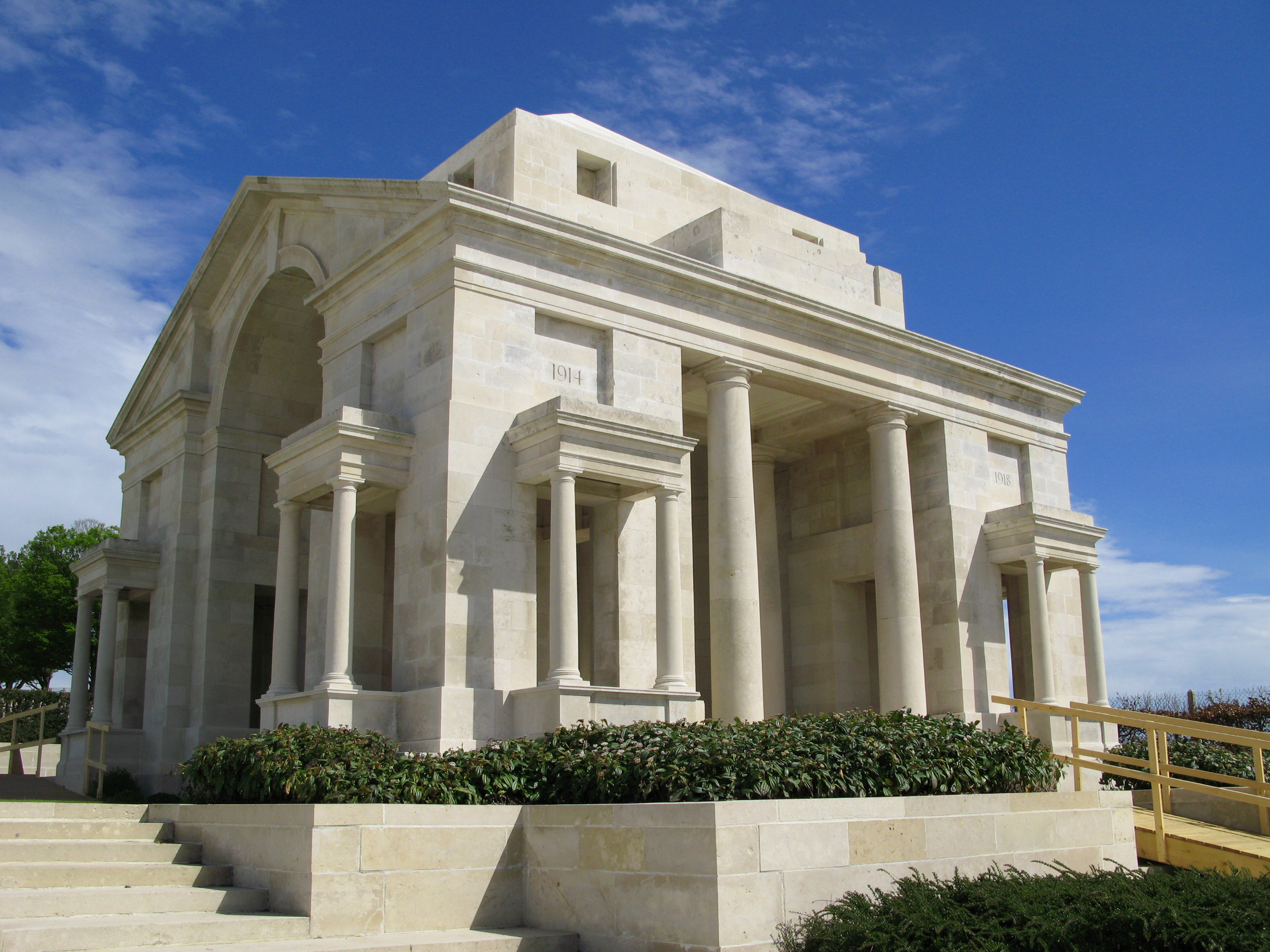
Southern entrance pavilion to the cemetery

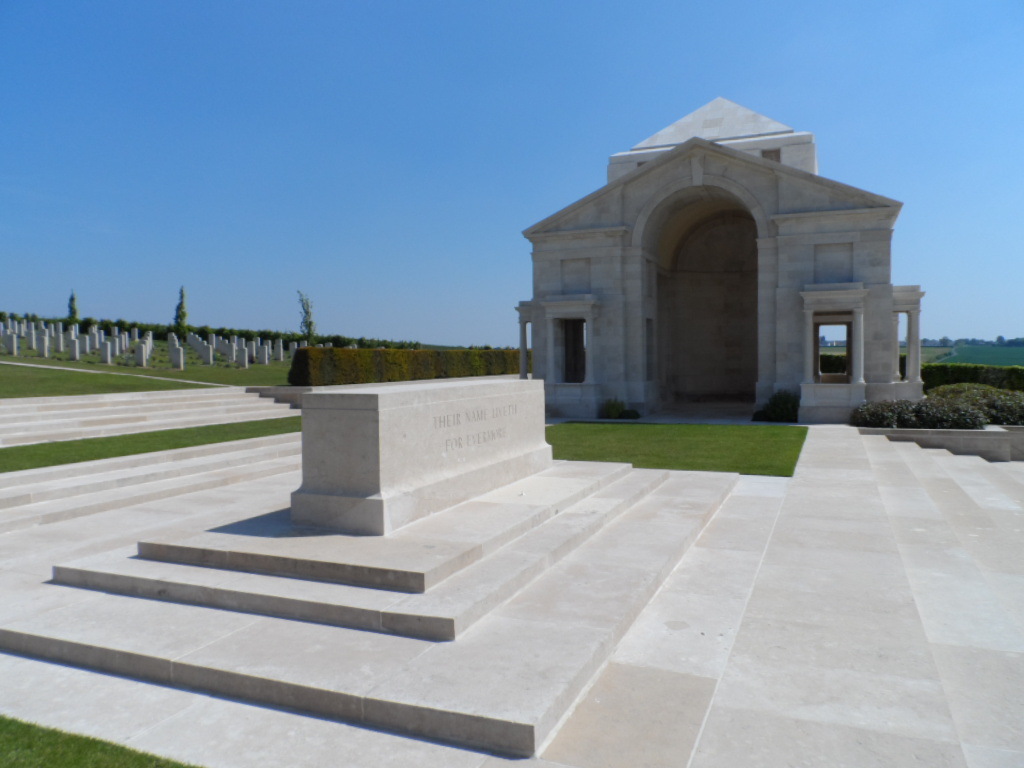
The Stone of Remembrance at the cemetery entrance

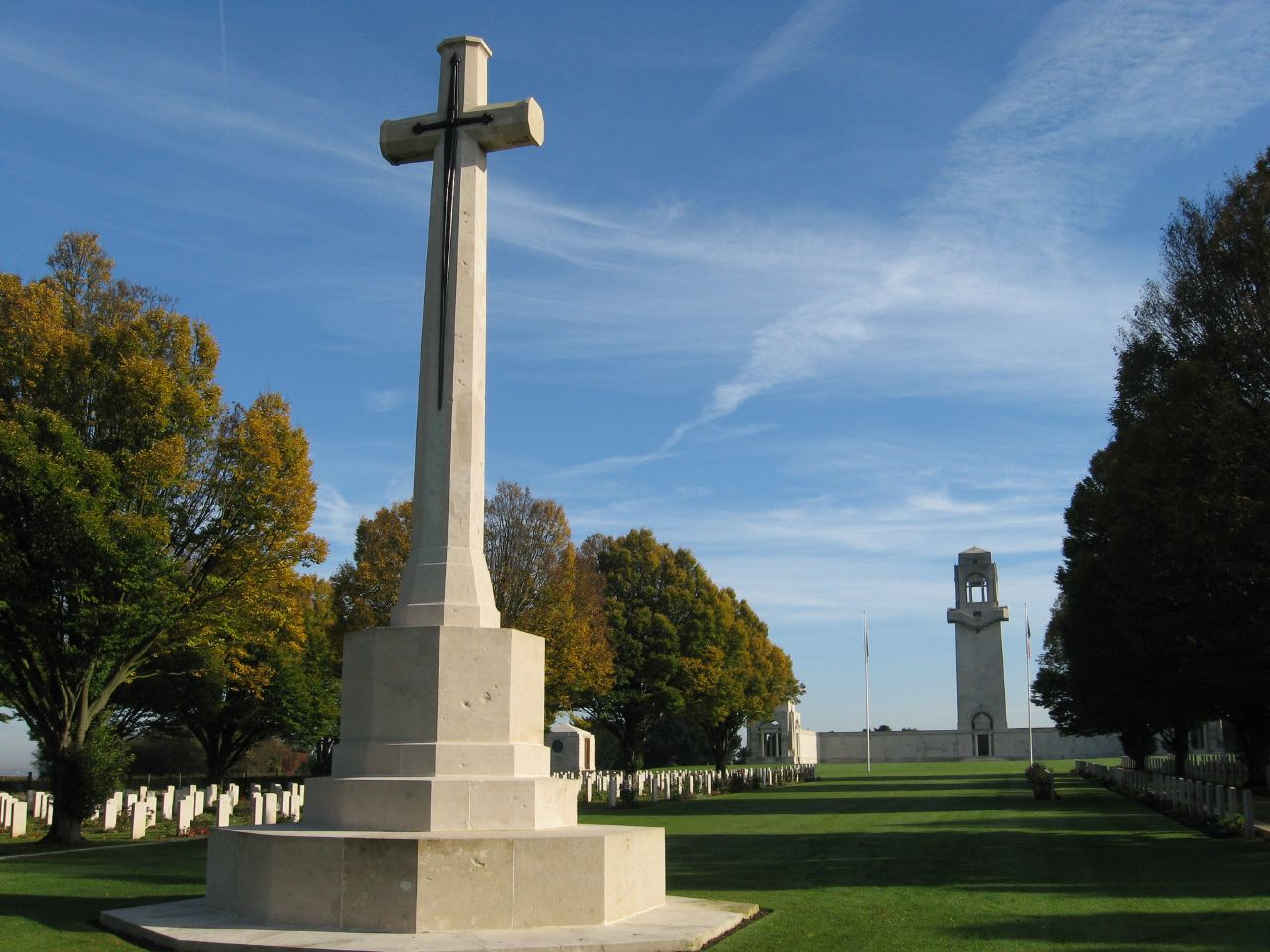
The Cross of Sacrifice and the tower in October 2007

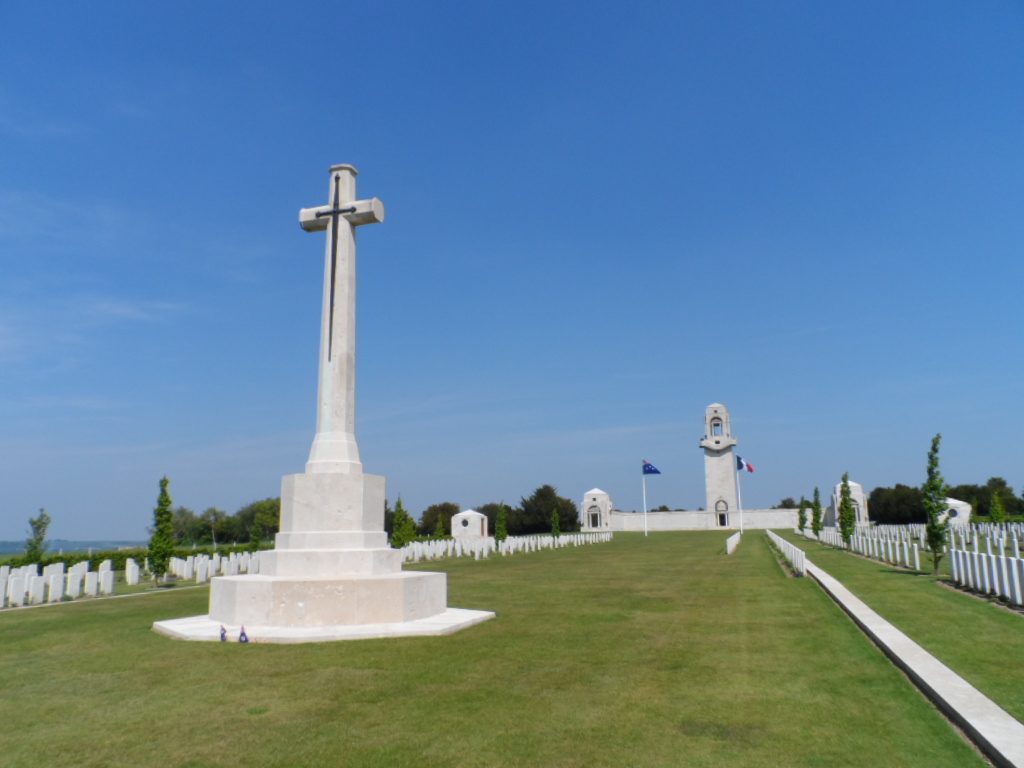
The Cross of Sacrifice and the tower in May 2014

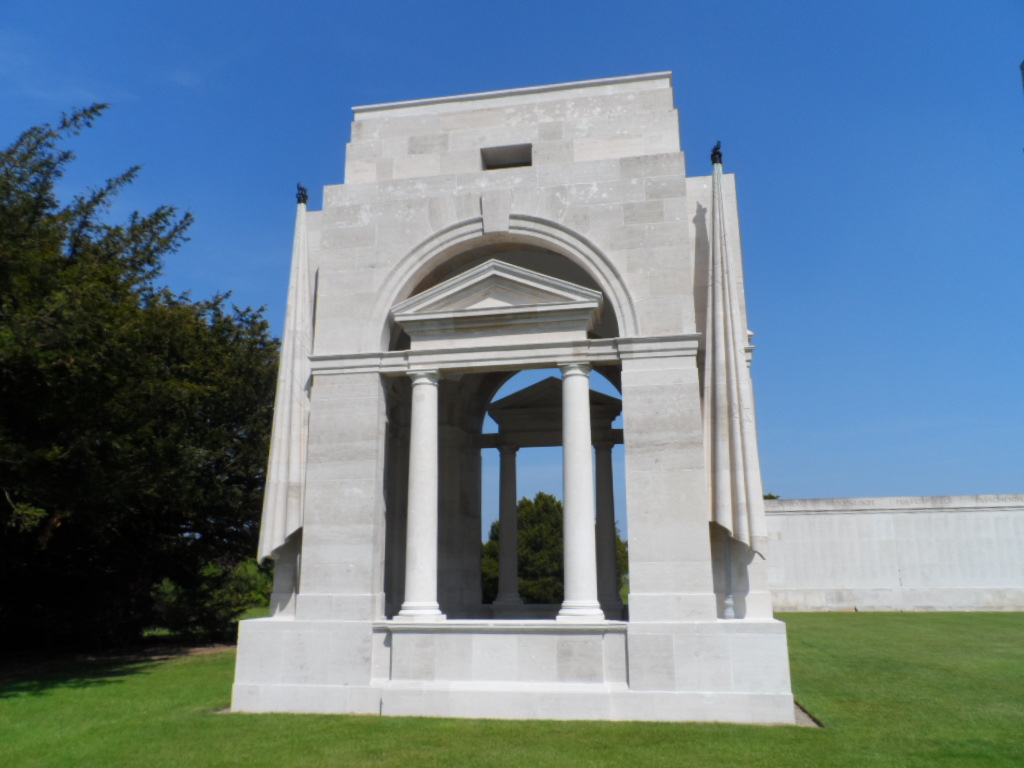
Shelter forming the left wing of the memorial

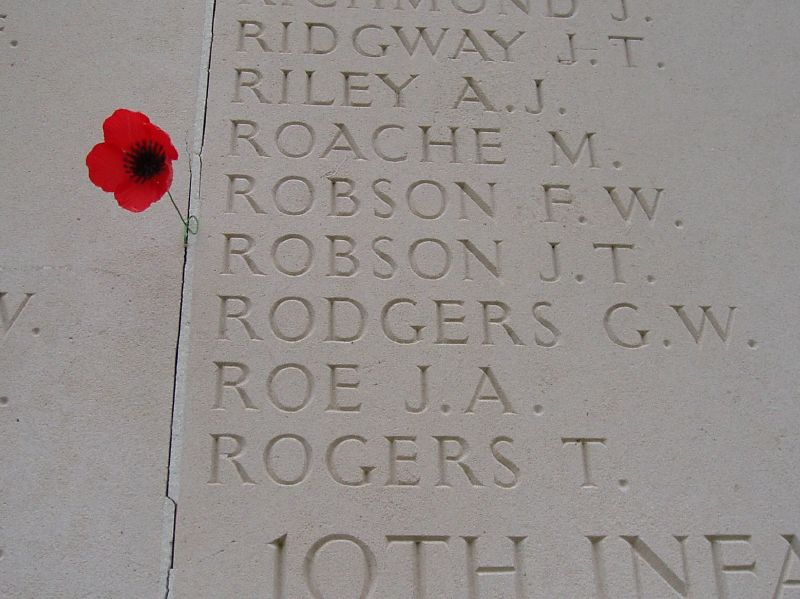
Some of the 11,000 names of the missing dead on the memorial

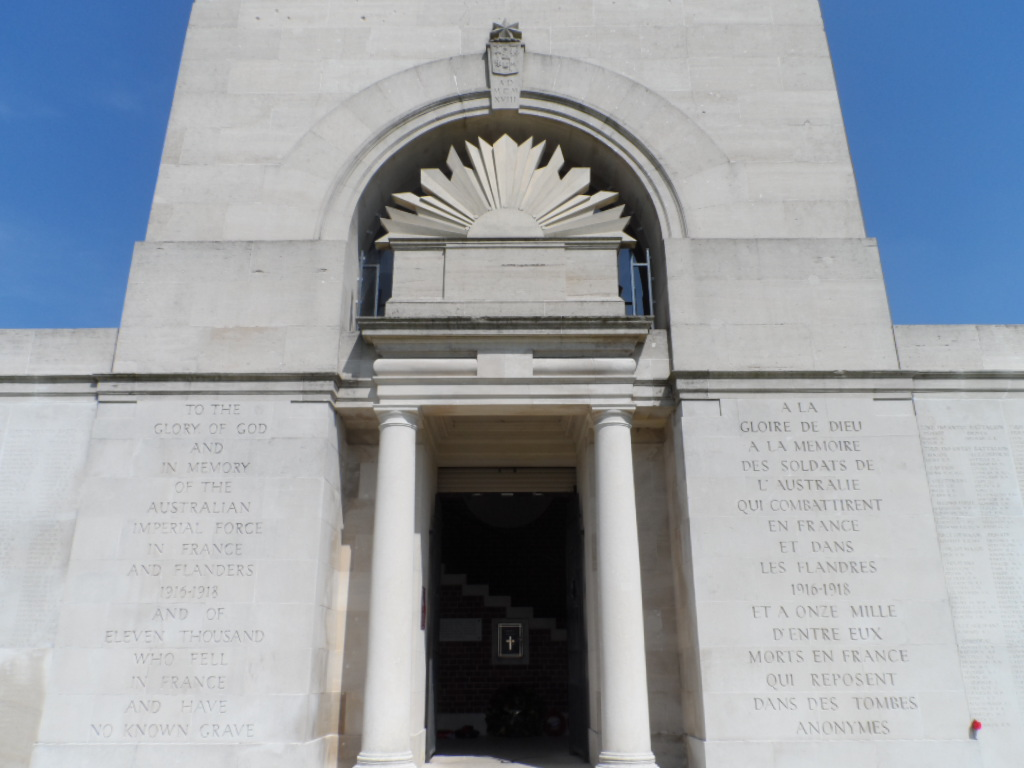
The inscriptions in English and French either side of the memorial tower entrance

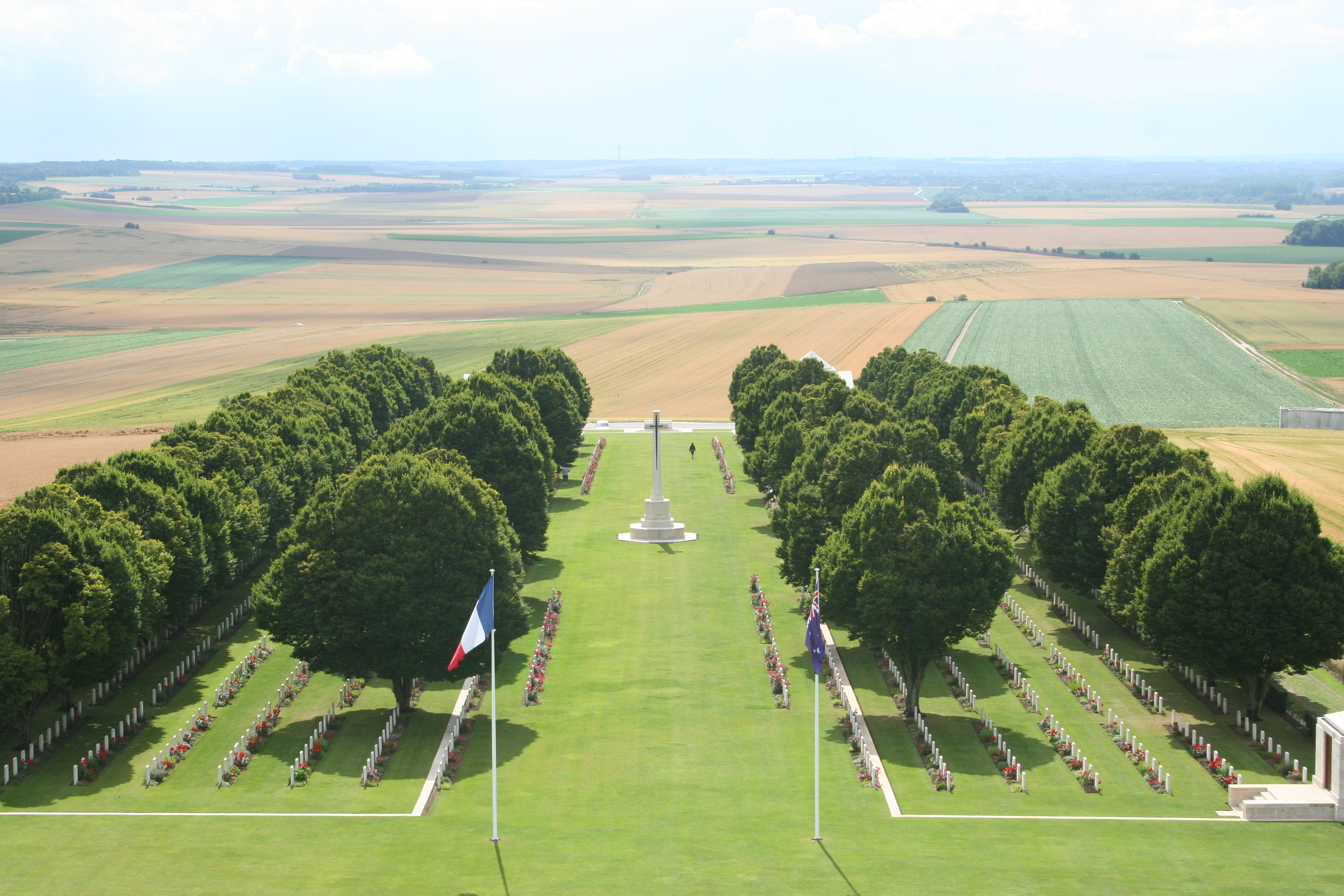
Villers-Bretonneux Military Cemetery viewed from the top of the tower in July 2008

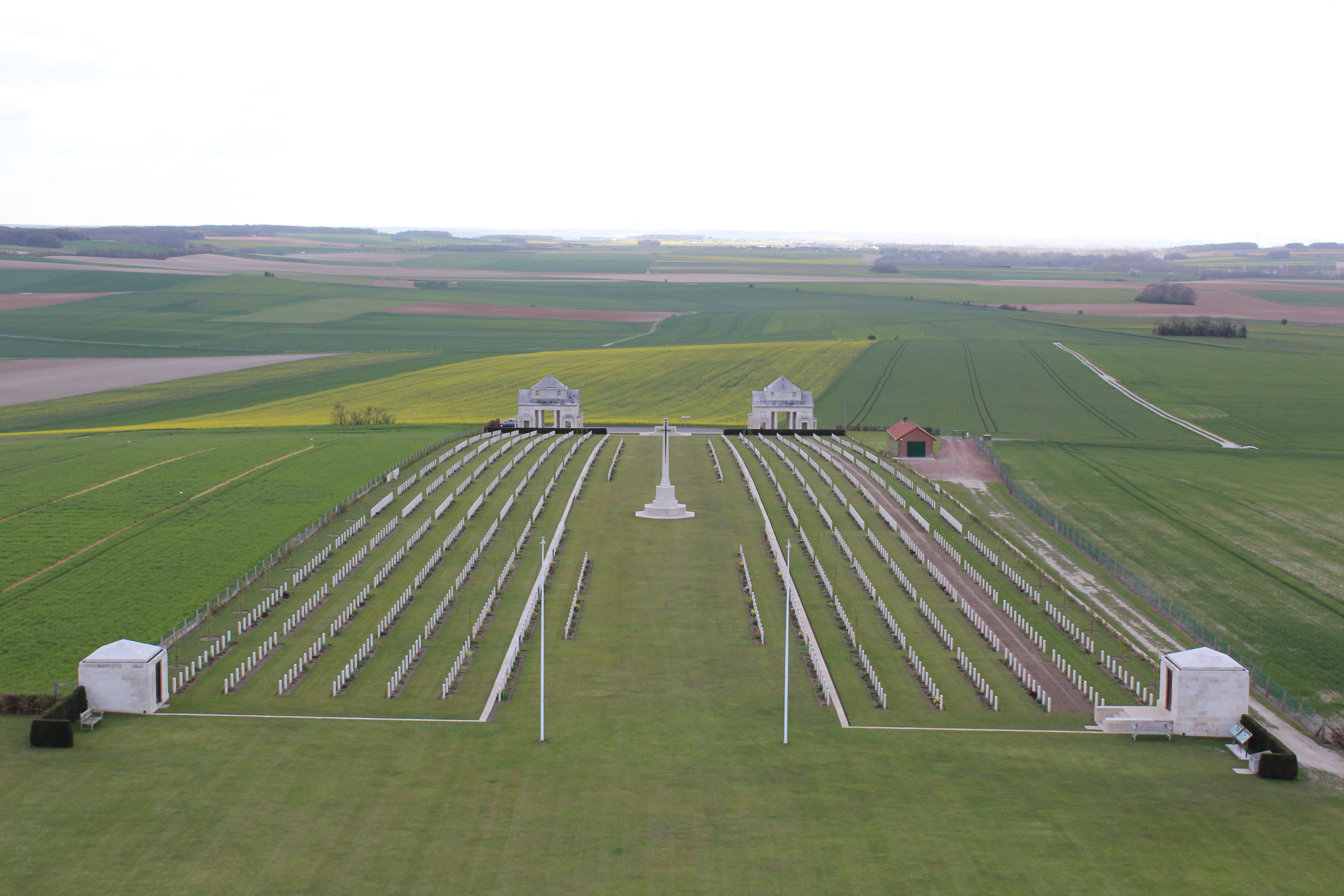
Villers-Bretonneux Military Cemetery viewed from the top of the tower in April 2012

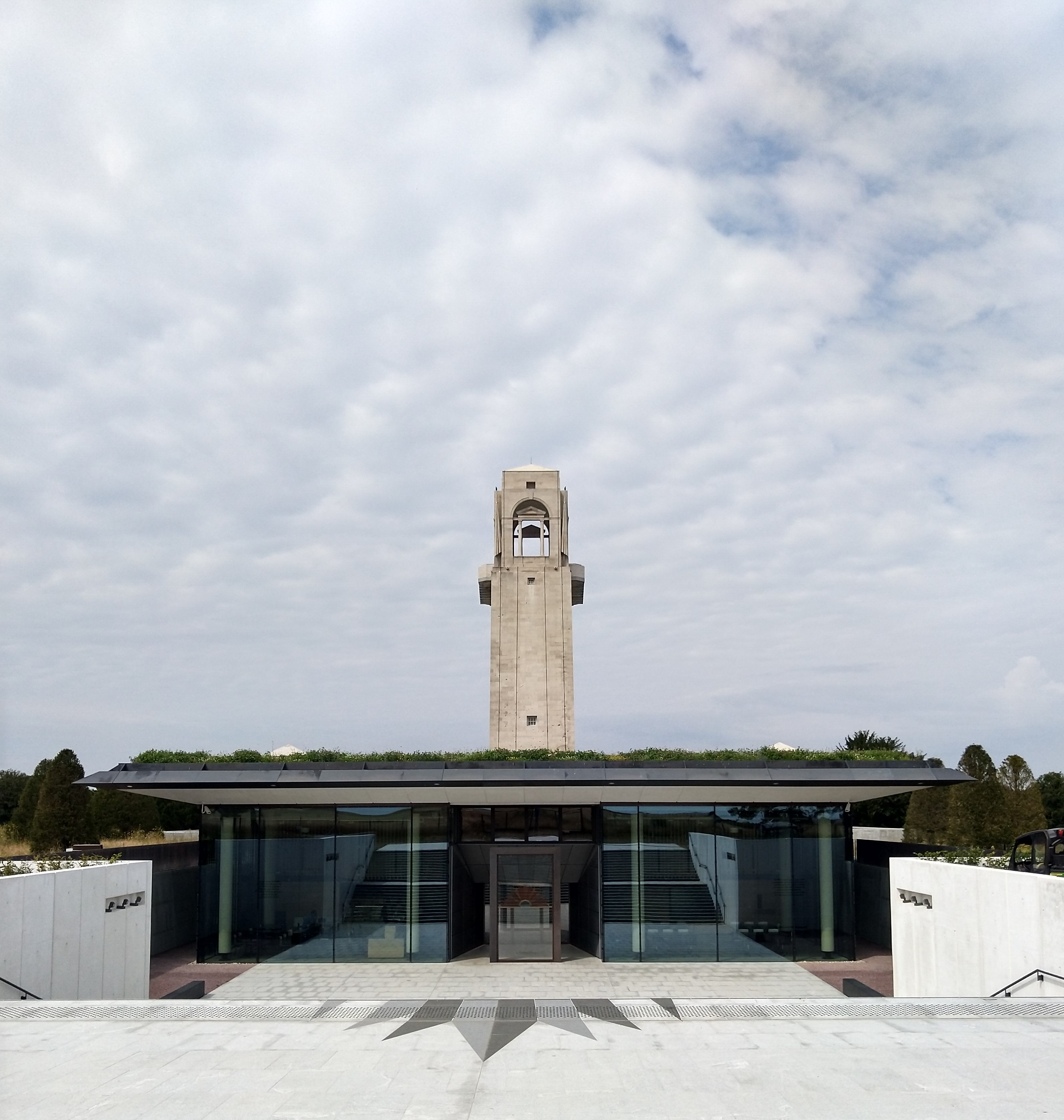
View of the Sir John Monash Center, looking towards the tower at the Villiers-Bretonneux Australian War Memorial, photographed in 2019
