= Sir John Monash Centre =

- Location within Hauts-de-France Location within France
- Established: 16 April 2018
- Location: Villers-Bretonneux, Somme, France
- Coordinates: 49°53′13.45″N 2°30′47.99″E
- Type: Museum
- Architect: Cox Architecture with Williams, Abrahams and Lampros
- Website: Sir John Monash Centre

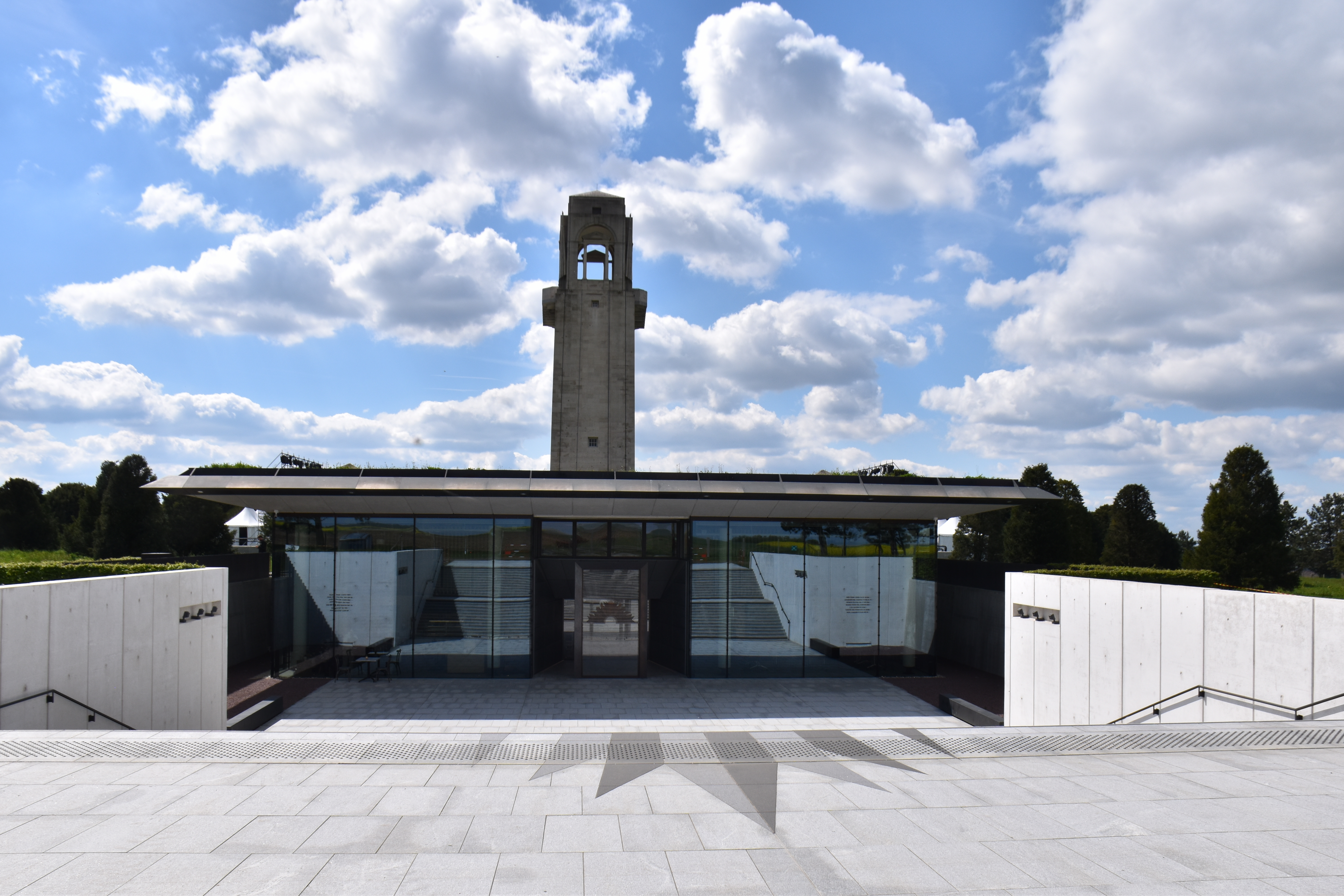
Entrance to the Sir John Monash Centre and Australian National Memorial

The Sir John Monash Centre is a museum and interpretive centre that commemorates Australian servicemen and women who served on the Western Front during the First World War. The centre, located near the village of Villers-Bretonneux (Somme) in northern France, is set behind the Villers–Bretonneux Australian National Memorial and within the military cemetery. The centre opened in April 2018.

== History ==
The Australian Government first proposed an Australian Visitor Centre on the Western Front at Le Hamel in 1998, but the project was abandoned until it resurfaced eight years later. The design of the Sir John Monash Centre was unveiled by Australian Prime Minister Tony Abbott on 26 April 2015, the day after Anzac Day, following an international design competition won by Cox Architecture. The centre is named after General Sir John Monash, who led the Australian Corps on the Western Front in 1918. The A$100 million cost was met by the Australian Government. The centre's opening was in 2018, the centenary year of the end of the war, with the official opening ceremony held prior to Anzac Day, 25 April.

== Official opening ==
The centre opened to visitors on 16 April 2018. It was officially opened by Australian Prime Minister Malcolm Turnbull on 24 April 2018, saying "This new centre expresses our gratitude for all our men and women who fought—and continue to fight—for our values and our interests. And in the midst of the stone, and steel, and glass of this serene monument, we know that the best way to honour the diggers of 1918 is to support the servicemen and women, the veterans and the families of today."

Also in attendance was French Prime Minister, Édouard Philippe, who paid tribute to Australian diggers, "We will never forget that 100 years ago, a young and brave nation on the other side of the world made history by writing our history" and, in recognition of Monash, said his tactics had given the allied forces a critical advantage.

== Description ==
Located behind the Villers-Bretonneux memorial, and built partially underground and with a turf roof, the one thousand square metre centre is designed to be "subservient" to the war memorial and has been described by one of the architects, Joe Agius, as "almost an anti-building, connected to the monument from an abstract and geometric point of view". Australian war artists Lyndell Brown and Charles Green designed a major tapestry, Morning Star which was created by the Australian Tapestry Workshop and hangs in the museum's foyer.

The centre tells the Australian story of the Western Front in the First World War. Through a series of interactive media installations visitors are able to use their own mobile device, loaded with the SJMC App as a 'virtual tour guide', throughout the Villers-Bretonneux Military Cemetery, the Australian National Memorial and the Sir John Monash Centre.

The Sir John Monash Centre forms part of the Australian Remembrance Trail along the Western Front, which links sites of significance to Australians, including battlefields, cemeteries and other memorials.

== Controversies ==
Due to a change of government in 2015, with Malcolm Turnbull replacing Tony Abbott as Prime Minister of Australia, a controversy arose with regard to the cost of the Sir John Monash Centre. Members of the community expressed their concerns about the hefty price tag of the new centre. The Abbott government had committed a $100 million to the project (about 60 million euros), a budget many times superior to those that had been necessary to build the British and Canadian centres at Thiepval and Vimy. As a result of this controversy, the cost of the SJMC was subjected to an inquiry by the Australian Parliamentary Standing Committee on Public Works in June 2015. During the inquiry, Department of Veterans' Affairs' representatives highlighted underground building and cutting-edge new technologies as the main factors that justified the $100 million budget.

A second controversy that arose from the SJMC's construction pertained to its visitation rate. The Department of Veterans’ Affairs had claimed before the construction of the centre that it would attract about 110,000 visitors a year. Within a few months of the opening of the SJMC, it became clear that the centre would not meet that target. The Sydney Morning Herald published an article titled “$100m Monash Centre on track to miss visitor target by many thousands”, which prompted other articles on the matter. The French press reported that from April 2018 to April 2019, the centre received 54,000 visitors, around half as many as DVA had expected. This attendance is modest compared to that of other war museums and visitor centres on the Western Front such as those at Péronne, Meaux, Ypres, Vimy or Verdun for example. The majority of visitors to the SJMC are Australians.
