= Marcelcave station =

French railway station

Marcelcave
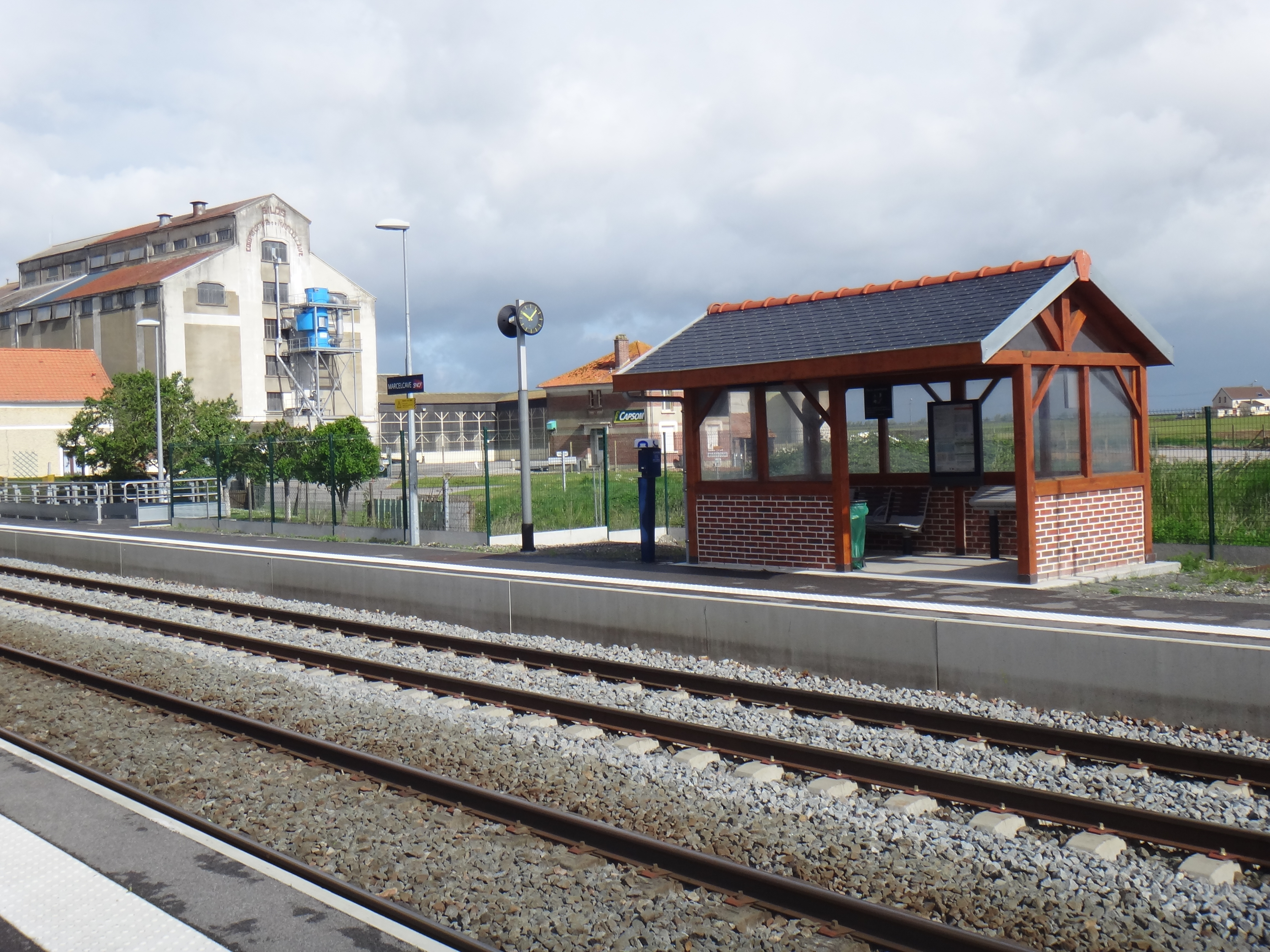

General information
- Location: Marcelcave
- Coordinates: 49°51′12″N 2°34′54″E
- Owner: RFF/SNCF
- Line: Amiens–Laon railway

Other information
- Station code: 87313445

Services
Preceding station	TER Hauts-de-France	Following station
Villers-Bretonneux towards Amiens	Proxi P20	Rosières towards Laon
Location

Marcelcave is a railway station located in the commune of Marcelcave in the Somme department, France. The station is served by TER Hauts-de-France trains (Amiens - Laon).

== See also ==
- List of SNCF stations in Hauts-de-France
