= Villers-Bretonneux station =

Railway station in Villers-Bretonneux, France

Villers-Bretonneux
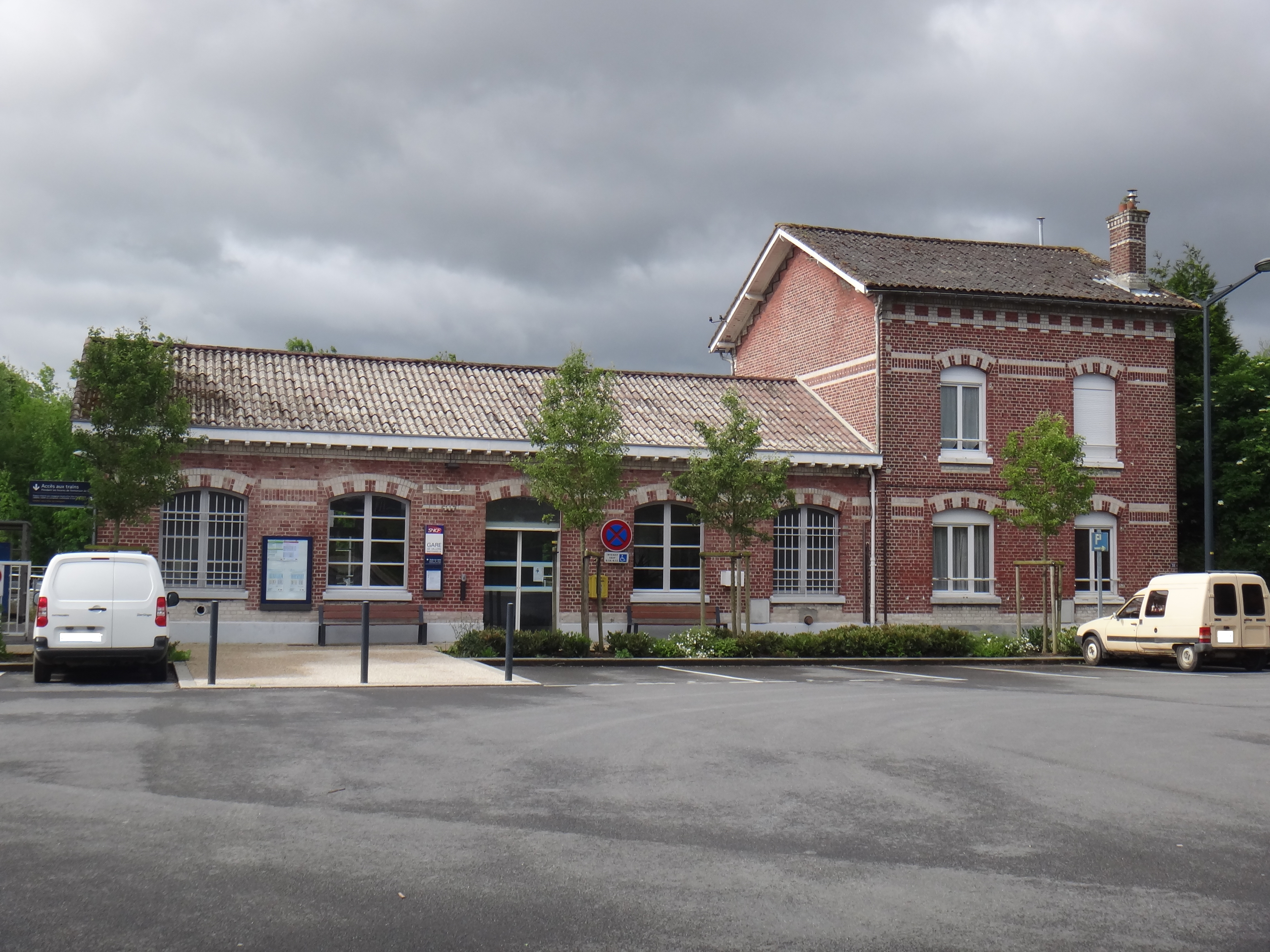

General information
- Location: Place de la Gare; Villers-Bretonneux
- Coordinates: 49°51′46″N 2°31′17″E
- Owner: RFF/SNCF
- Line: Amiens–Laon railway
- Platforms: 2
- Tracks: 2

Other information
- Station code: 87313437

History
- Opened: 1 July 1867

Services
| Preceding station | TER Hauts-de-France | Following station |
|---|---|---|
| Amiens Terminus | Proxi P20 | Marcelcave towards Laon |
Location

Villers-Bretonneux is a railway station located in the commune of Villers-Bretonneux in the Somme department, France. The station is served by TER Hauts-de-France trains (Amiens - Laon).

The station is opened from Monday to Friday from 5:45 to 9 am and from 12:30 to 1:30 pm. Services are provided by Taxi TER with Blangy-Glisy.

== See also ==
- List of SNCF stations in Hauts-de-France
