= Villers-Bretonneux =

- Commune
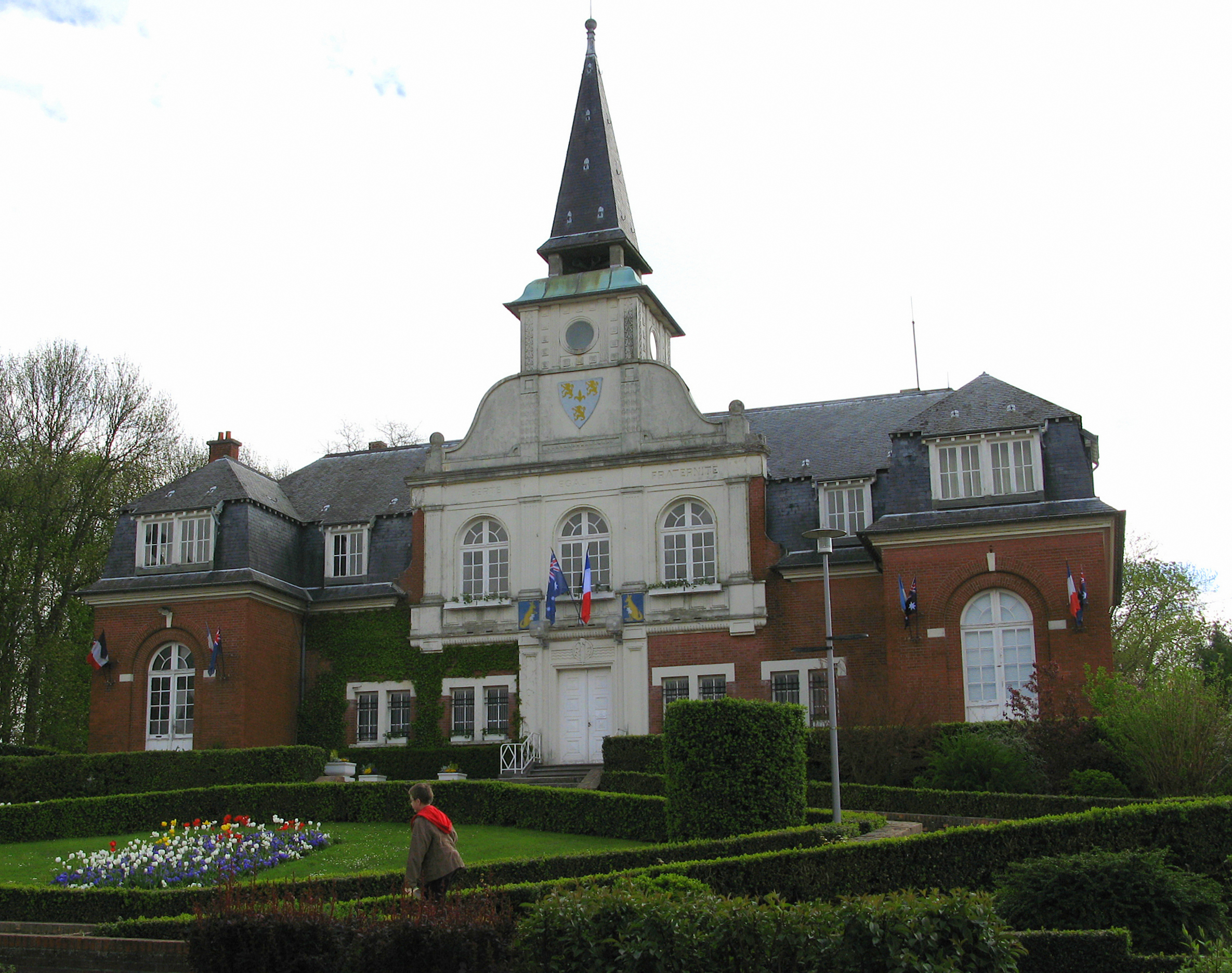
- Villers-Bretonneux Town Hall

- Coat of arms
- Location of Villers-Bretonneux
- Location within France Location within Hauts-de-France
- Coordinates: 49°52′N 2°31′E
- Country: France
- Region: Hauts-de-France
- Department: Somme
- Arrondissement: Amiens
- Canton: Amiens-4
- Intercommunality: Val de Somme

Government
  - Mayor (2020–2026): Didier Dinouard
- Area^{1}: 14.51 km^{2} (5.60 sq mi)
- Elevation: 91 m (299 ft)
- Highest elevation: 107 m (351 ft)
- Lowest elevation: 45 m (148 ft)
- Population (2023): 4,647
  - Density: 320.3/km^{2} (829.5/sq mi)
- Time zone: UTC+01:00 (CET)
  - Summer (DST): UTC+02:00 (CEST)
- INSEE/Postal code: 80799 /80800
- ^{1} French Land Register data, which excludes lakes, ponds, glaciers > 1 km^{2} (0.386 sq mi or 247 acres) and river estuaries.

Villers-Bretonneux (French pronunciation: [vilɛʁ bʁətɔnø]) is a commune in the Somme department in Hauts-de-France in northern France.

== Geography ==
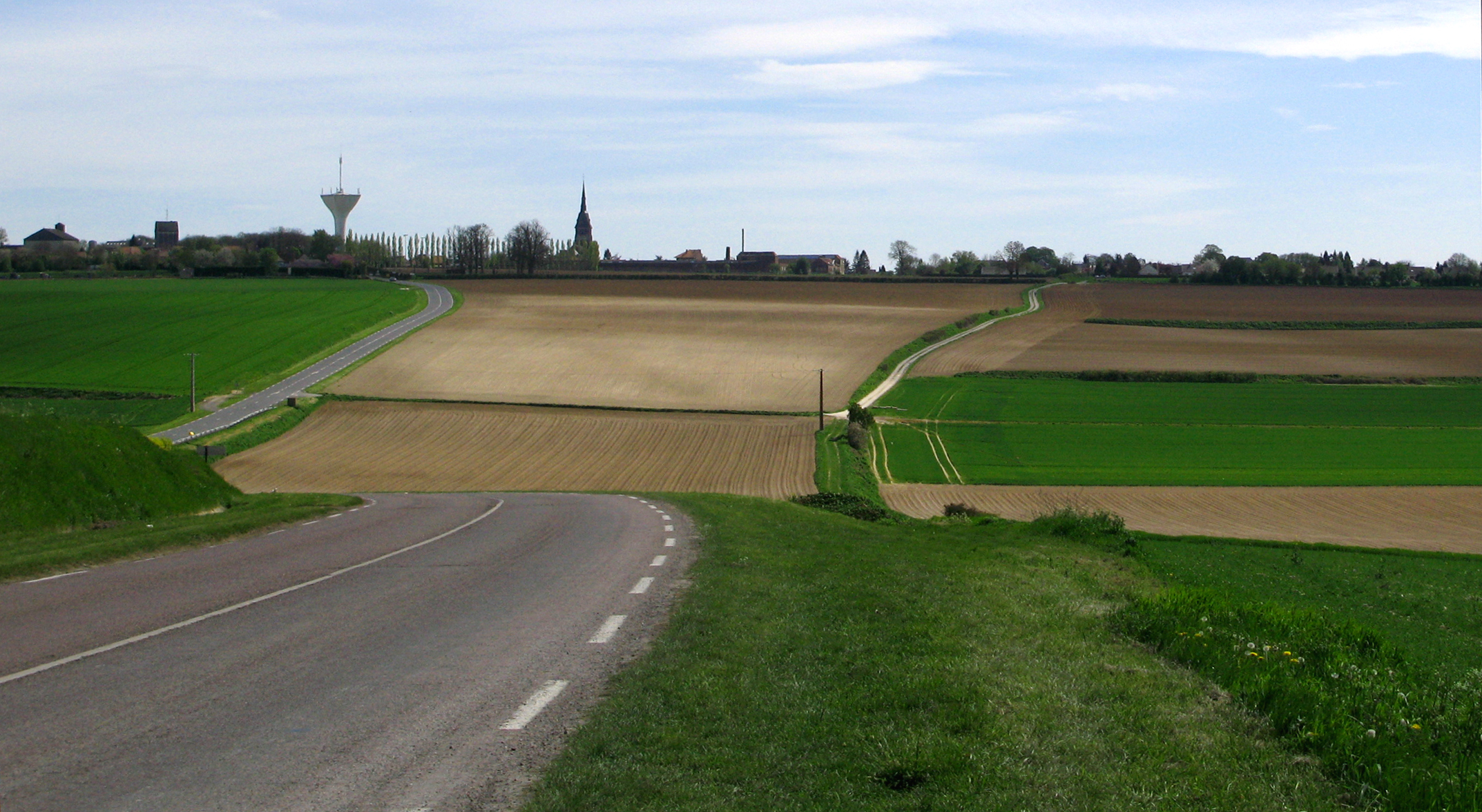
Villers-Bretonneux view from the Australian memorial park

Villers-Bretonneux is situated some 19 km due east of Amiens, on the D1029 road and the A29 motorway.

Villers-Bretonneux borders a particularly flat landscape towards the east, which can be considered as the western boundary of the Santerre plateau and the eastern boundary of the Amiénois.

The territory of the commune is crossed by the old national road 29 (current RD 1029), perfectly rectilinear road following the route of the ancient Roman road linking Amiens to Saint-Quentin in the Aisne. The agglomeration is located at the crossroads of the D 23 linking Corbie to Moreuil.

Villers-Bretonneux station is located on the railway line from Amiens to Laon via Tergnier.

== History ==
=== Prehistoric era ===
Polished flints from the Neolithic era indicate that a human presence has been in the commune for a long time.

=== Antiquity ===
Roman coins, remains of dwelling and a sandstone mill from during the Roman Empire have been found near the town, which was on the old way linking Amiens to Vermand.

=== Middle Ages ===
In 1840, archaeological excavations revealed stone coffins, vases and buckles dating from the Frankish period.

The first mention of the name Villers-Bretonneux is in a document from 1123. It was not until the 12th century that the Bretoneux or Bretonneux complement was added; prior to this the town was known as Villers. The origin of this change has historians perplexed. In 1200, the lord of Villers-Bretonneux, Adams de Villers was vassal of the Abbot of Corbie. In the 14th century, the village was surrounded by a wall twelve feet high and counted 140 hovels. The castle was surrounded by a wall fifteen feet high. Waleran de Rivery, lord of Rivery and Villers-Bretonneux, married Isabelle, second daughter of Jacques de Longroy (councilor and chamberlain of the Duke of Burgundy), lord of Querrieu, who was killed at the Battle of Agincourt in 1415. In the second half of the 15th century, the lord was Antoine de Rivery, knight, captain of Amiens in 1465 and lord of Rivery and Villers-Bretonneux.

=== 17th century ===
On 13 August 1636, the Spanish Army set fire to the village, as well as several villages in the vicinity. It was probably during these events connected with the capture of Corbie that the fortress was destroyed. An exact date is not known but in 1681 it was mentioned as completely in ruins.

=== 18th century ===
In 1700, the seigniory of Villers-Bretonneux was sold to Pierre Dufresne, lord of Marcelcave. As early as 1737, the wool industry was mentioned in Villers-Bretonneux. In 1778, Pierre Dottin, a native of Villers-Bretonneux, published a memoir on the "la pomme de terre" in Les Affiches de la Picardie.

=== 19th century ===
In 1838, records show that Villers-Bretonneux is one of the richest and most commercial communes in the department and that factories producing woollen stockings and flannels are well established. In 1859, the town built a church that was destroyed during the First World War. It housed a wooden Virgin from the l'école de Blasset school.

On 27 November 1870, Villers Bretonneux was the scene of a battle of the Franco-Prussian War (1870–1871) for the defense of Amiens. The French were defeated, and the population had to pay a tribute of 100,000 francs to the Prussians.

=== 20th century ===
In the First World War the town was the site of the First Battle of Villers-Bretonneux and Second Battle of Villers-Bretonneux. The first tank-against-tank combat in history took place here on 24 April 1918.

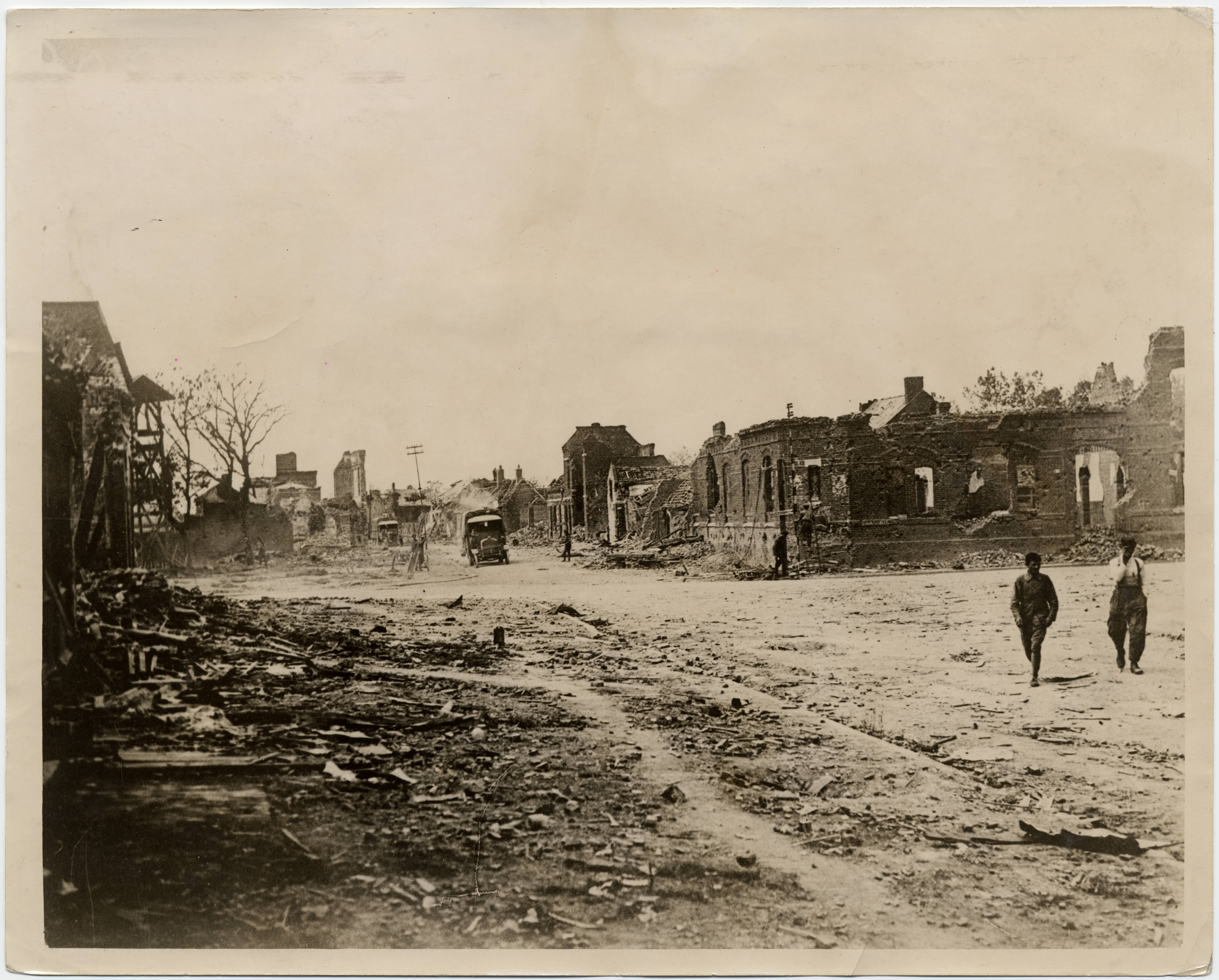

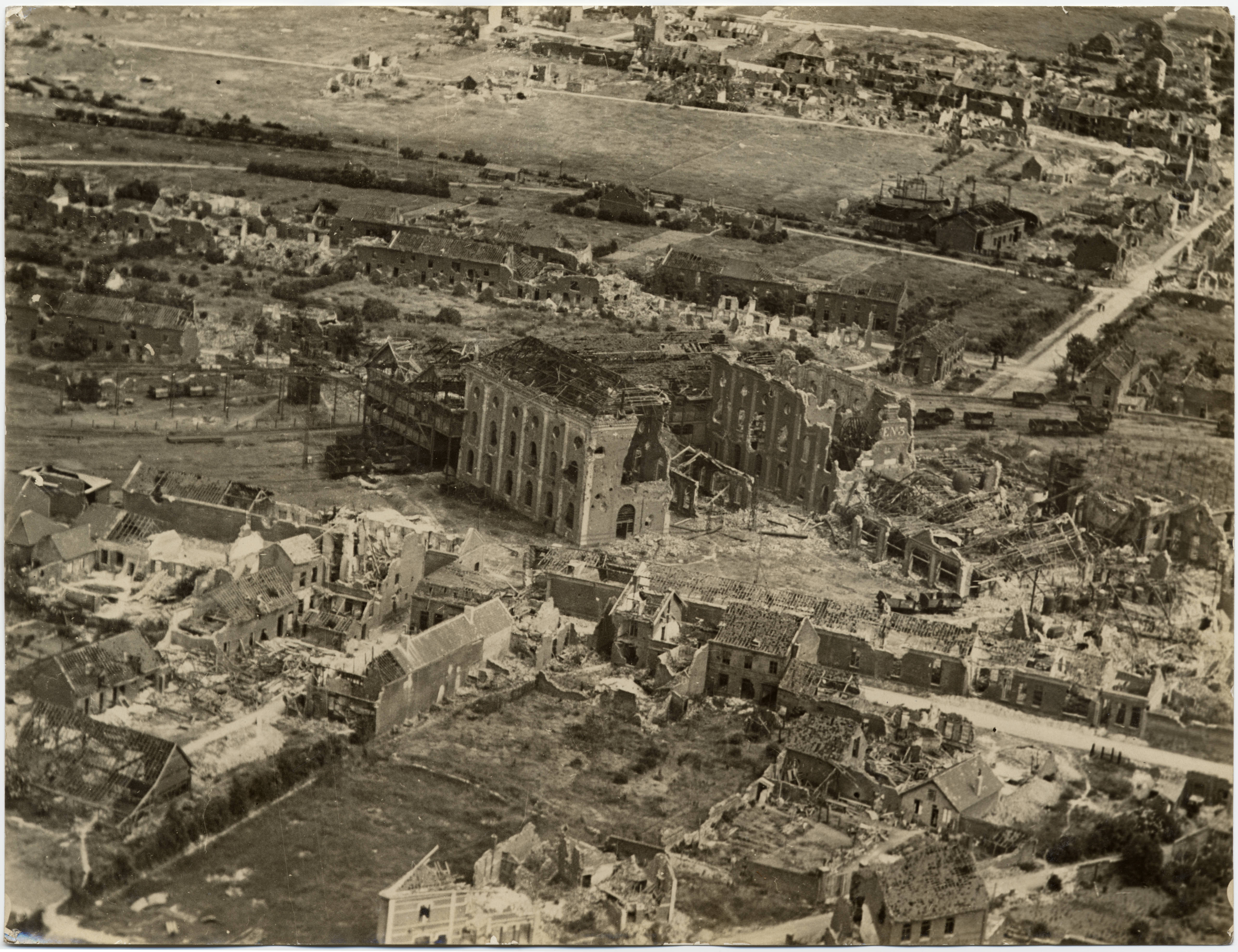

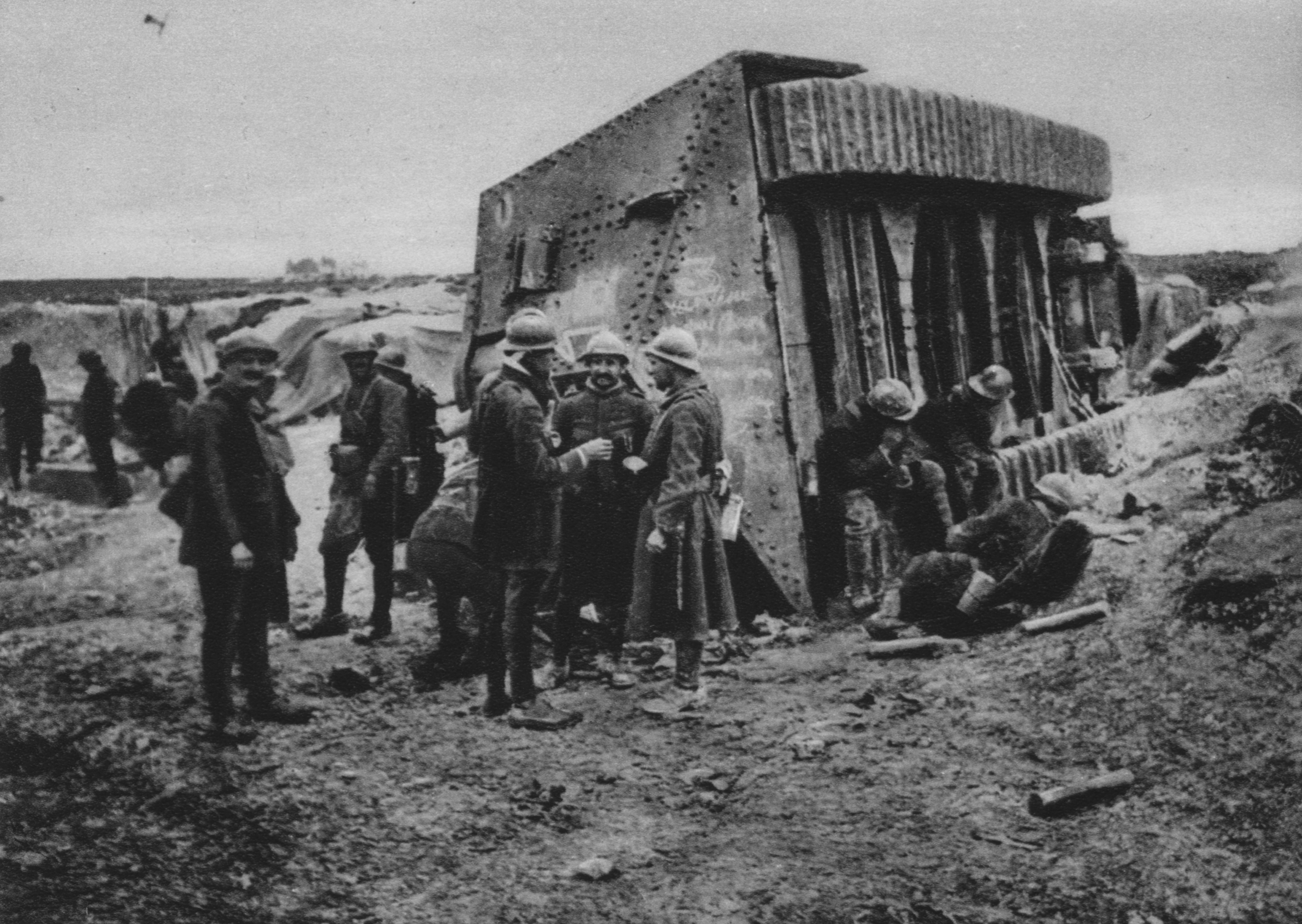
German Tank outside the town 1918

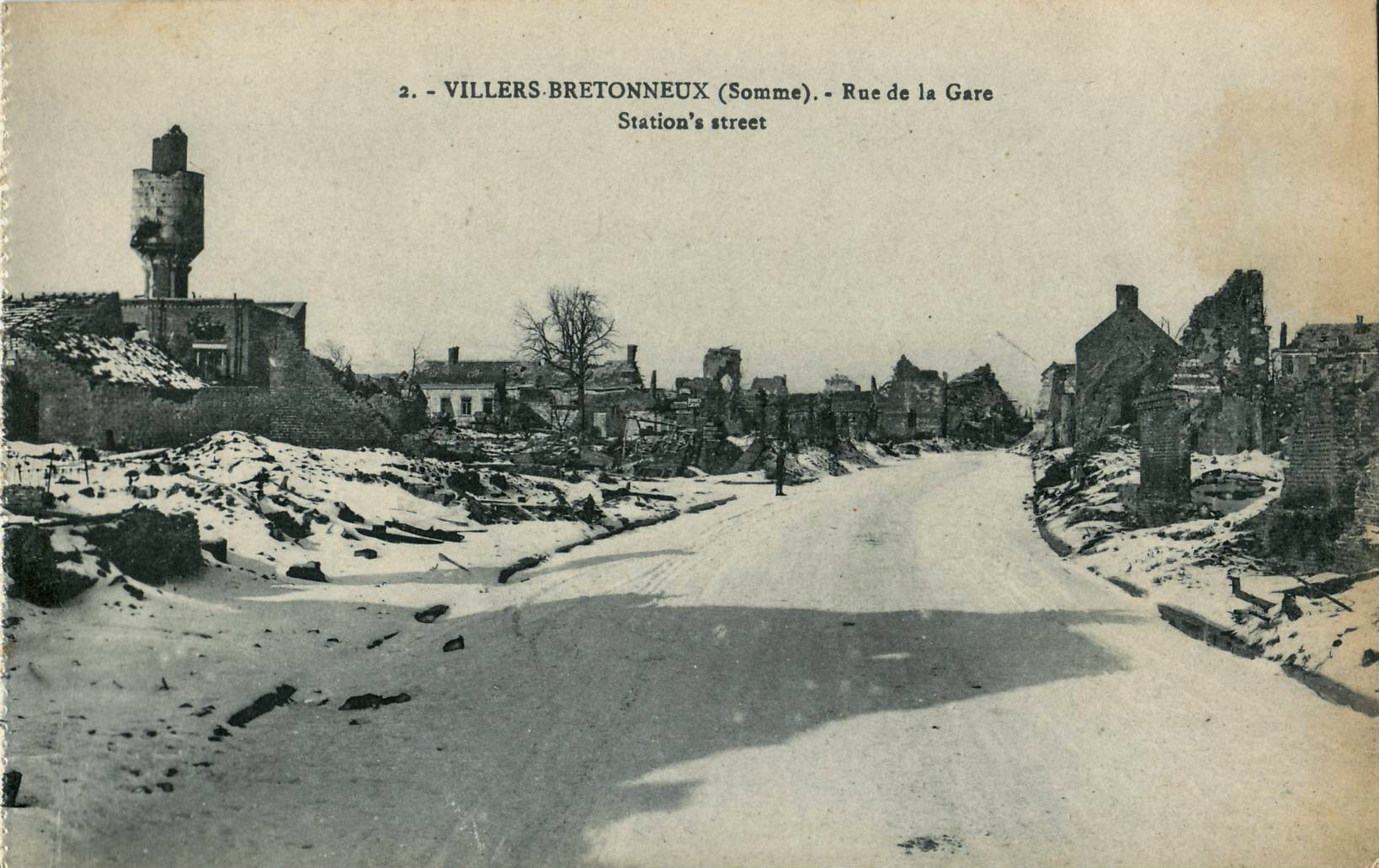
Rue de la Gare, Villers Bretonneux 1918.

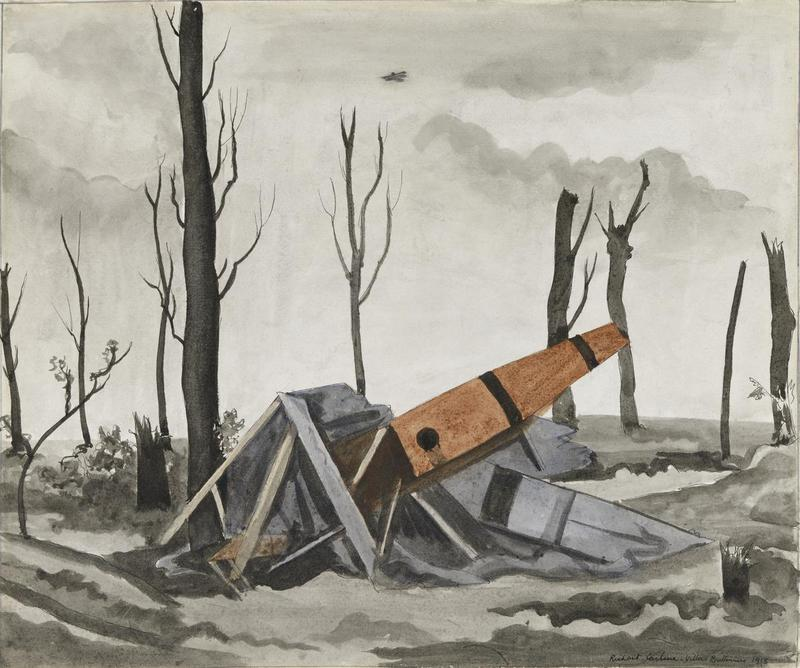
A Crashed Fokker at Villers-Bretonneux

In the interwar years, the city of Melbourne in Australia was a sponsor of the town of Villers-Bretonneux and helped in its reconstruction as did as the State of Victoria more generally. Charlotte Crivelli who was a central figure on the committee which organised this sponsorship and organised many of the fundraising events. On 22 July 1938, the Villers–Bretonneux Australian National Memorial was opened by the British sovereigns, George VI, Elizabeth Bowes-Lyon and Albert Lebrun, President of the French Republic. The names of 11,000 fighters without burial are engraved in the stone.

In World War II, the British Army Sherman tank Armoured Division passed through Villers-Bretonneux, on 1 September 1944. There is a memorial near the town dedicated to the memory of the Forces françaises de l'intérieur, shot and deported during 1939–45, located on the road to Amiens.

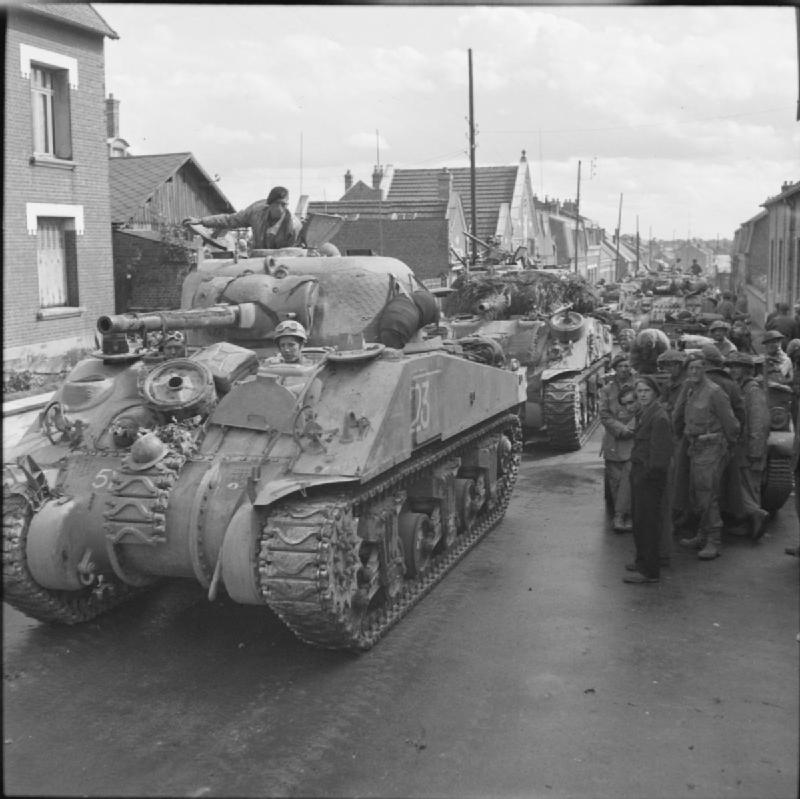

=== Twenty-first century ===
Today, Villers-Bretonneux is a modest village, which grew significantly thanks to the introduction of the knitwear industry in the 19th century. After the destruction of the First and Second World Wars, the town was rebuilt. The city center concentrates public buildings and most of the dwellings.

The municipality is now experiencing a new development thanks to its proximity to the Amiens agglomeration and to an exit from the A29 motorway (Saint-Quentin-Le Havre). Subdivisions of individual houses were built.

Patrick Simon, the Mayor of Villers-Bretonneux from 2008 until 2020, was a vocal proponent of Australia–France relations. Simon oversaw the refurbishment of Villers-Bretonneux's Franco-Australian First World War Museum and helped to establish the Sir John Monash Centre, which opened in 2018. He also promoted increased relations and exchanges with Robinvale, Villers-Bretonneux's twinned town in the Australian state of Victoria. Simon was awarded an honorary Order of Australia (AO) in 2015 for his contributions to Australian-Franco relations. He died in office in May 2020 during the COVID-19 pandemic in France.

== Economic and services ==
The increase in the population of the commune was linked to the development of knitwear in the 19th century. This activity began to decline from the 1880s onwards. The decline continued after the two world wars until they disappeared completely at the dawn of the twenty-first century.

Today, it is the services that constitute most of the economic activity: shopping center near the motorway exit, retail and handicrafts in the city center. Health services are represented by the presence of a nursing home and a convalescent and functional rehabilitation center in addition to the liberal professionals. The school functions are represented by nursery and primary schools and by a college.

== First World War ==
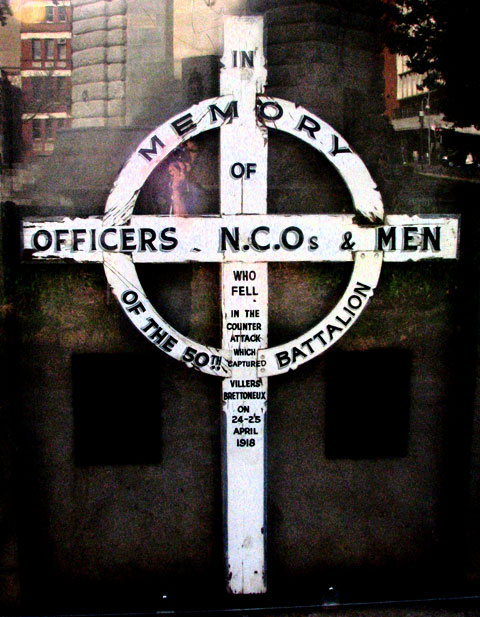
Cross planted in France by soldiers to honour the fallen. Now part of the war memorial in Adelaide, Australia.

In the First World War, on 24 April 1918, Villers-Bretonneux was the site of the world's first battle between two tank forces: three British Mark IVs against three German A7Vs. The Germans took the town, but that night and the next day it was recaptured by two brigades of the First Australian Imperial Force at a cost of some 1,200 Australian lives. The town's mayor spoke of the Australian troops on 14 July 1919 when unveiling a memorial in their honour:

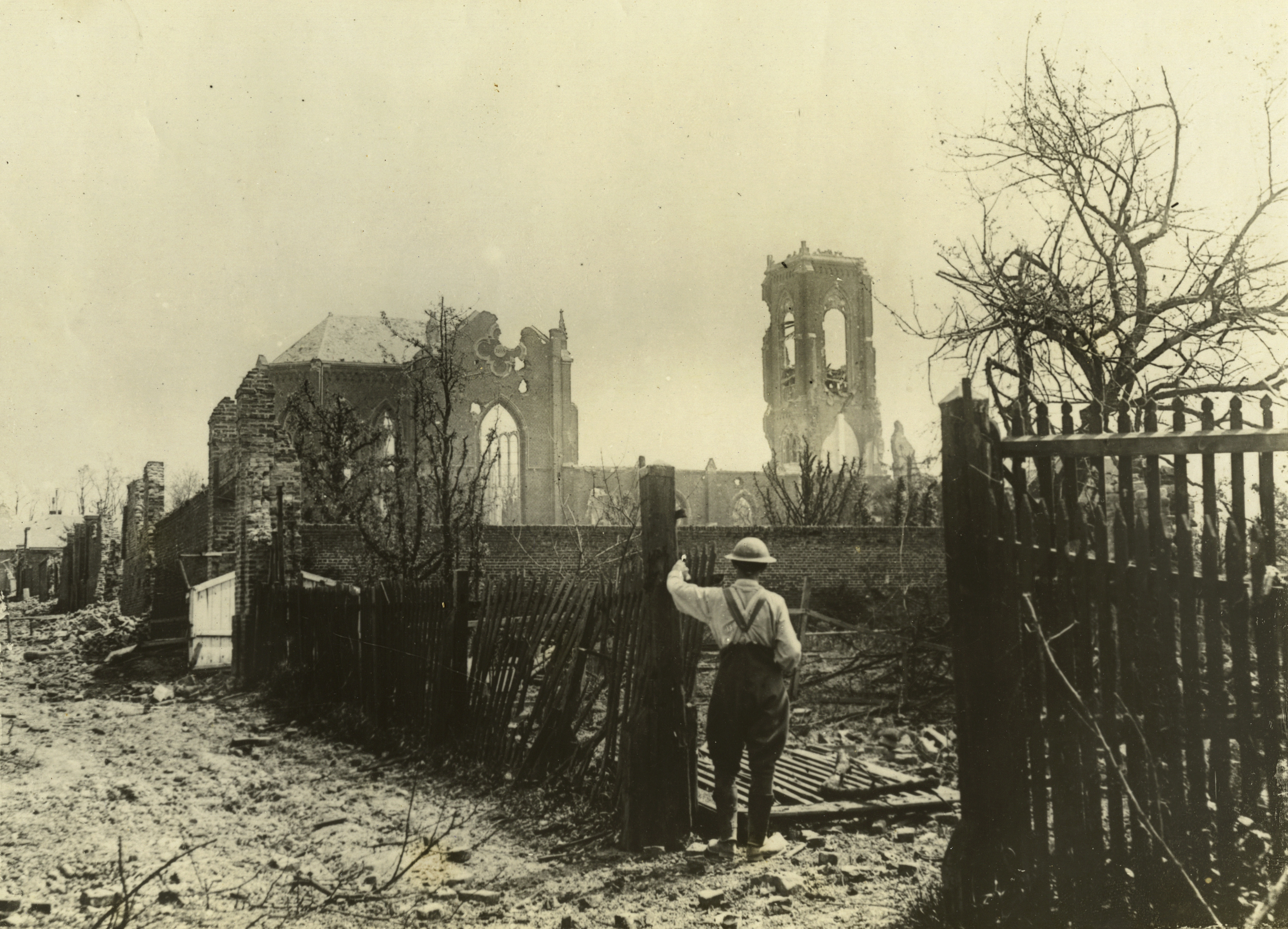
Unidentified soldier observing the ruins of the church at Villers-Bretonneux, France, 1918

"The first inhabitants of Villers-Bretonneux to re-establish themselves in the ruins of what was once a flourishing little town have, by means of donations, shown a desire to thank the valorous Australian Armies, who with the spontaneous enthusiasm and characteristic dash of their race, in a few hours drove out an enemy ten times their number...They offer a memorial tablet, a gift which is but the least expression of their gratitude, compared with the brilliant feat which was accomplished by the sons of Australia...Soldiers of Australia, whose brothers lie here in French soil, be assured that your memory will always be kept alive, and that the burial places of your dead will always be respected and cared for.."

The Australian War Memorial in France is located just outside Villers-Bretonneux and in front of it lie the graves of over 770 Australian soldiers, as well as those of other British Empire soldiers involved in the campaign. The school in Villers-Bretonneux was rebuilt using donations from school children of Victoria, Australia (many of whom had relatives perish in the town's liberation) and above every blackboard is the inscription, "N'oublions jamais l'Australie" (Let us never forget Australia). The annual Anzac Day ceremony is held at this village on Anzac Day, 25 April. Traditionally, Australian commemorations have focused on Gallipoli. However, Anzac Day commemorations since 2008 have also focused on the Western Front, and dawn services marking the anniversary of the battle of 24/25 April 1918 are held on Anzac Day itself at Villers-Bretonneux.

Villers-Bretonneux is the sister city of Robinvale, Victoria, Australia.

== Population ==
Historical population

Year	Pop.	±% p.a.
1793	1,260	—
1800	1,253	−0.08%
1806	1,507	+3.12%
1821	1,679	+0.72%
1831	2,163	+2.57%
1836	2,508	+3.00%
1841	2,706	+1.53%
1846	3,125	+2.92%
1851	3,284	+1.00%
1856	3,368	+0.51%
1861	3,601	+1.35%
1866	4,235	+3.30%
1872	4,959	+2.67%
1876	5,356	+1.94%
1881	5,911	+1.99%
1886	5,939	+0.09%
1891	5,625	−1.08%
1896	5,173	−1.66%
1901	4,967	−0.81%

Year	Pop.	±% p.a.
1906	4,636	−1.37%
1911	4,438	−0.87%
1921	2,533	−5.45%
1926	3,552	+7.00%
1931	3,631	+0.44%
1936	3,397	−1.32%
1946	3,304	−0.28%
1954	3,326	+0.08%
1962	3,342	+0.06%
1968	3,474	+0.65%
1975	3,473	−0.00%
1982	3,347	−0.53%
1990	3,686	+1.21%
1999	3,952	+0.78%
2007	4,116	+0.51%
2012	4,210	+0.45%
2017	4,464	+1.18%
2023	4,647	+0.67%

Source: EHESS and INSEE (1968-2023)

== Places of interest ==
Delacour's château, or, as the Australian force called it, the "Red château", served as headquarters and billets for Allied generals during the Battle of the Somme. Marshal Foch stayed there. At the end of fighting in November 1918 it became the local headquarters of the Imperial (later Commonwealth) Graves Commission. Later abandoned, it was extensively cannibalised for building materials. Its skeleton, which remained as a tourist attraction until 2004, was razed in that year and all traces of it were removed to make way for a supermarket.

== See also ==
- Communes of the Somme department

== Image gallery ==
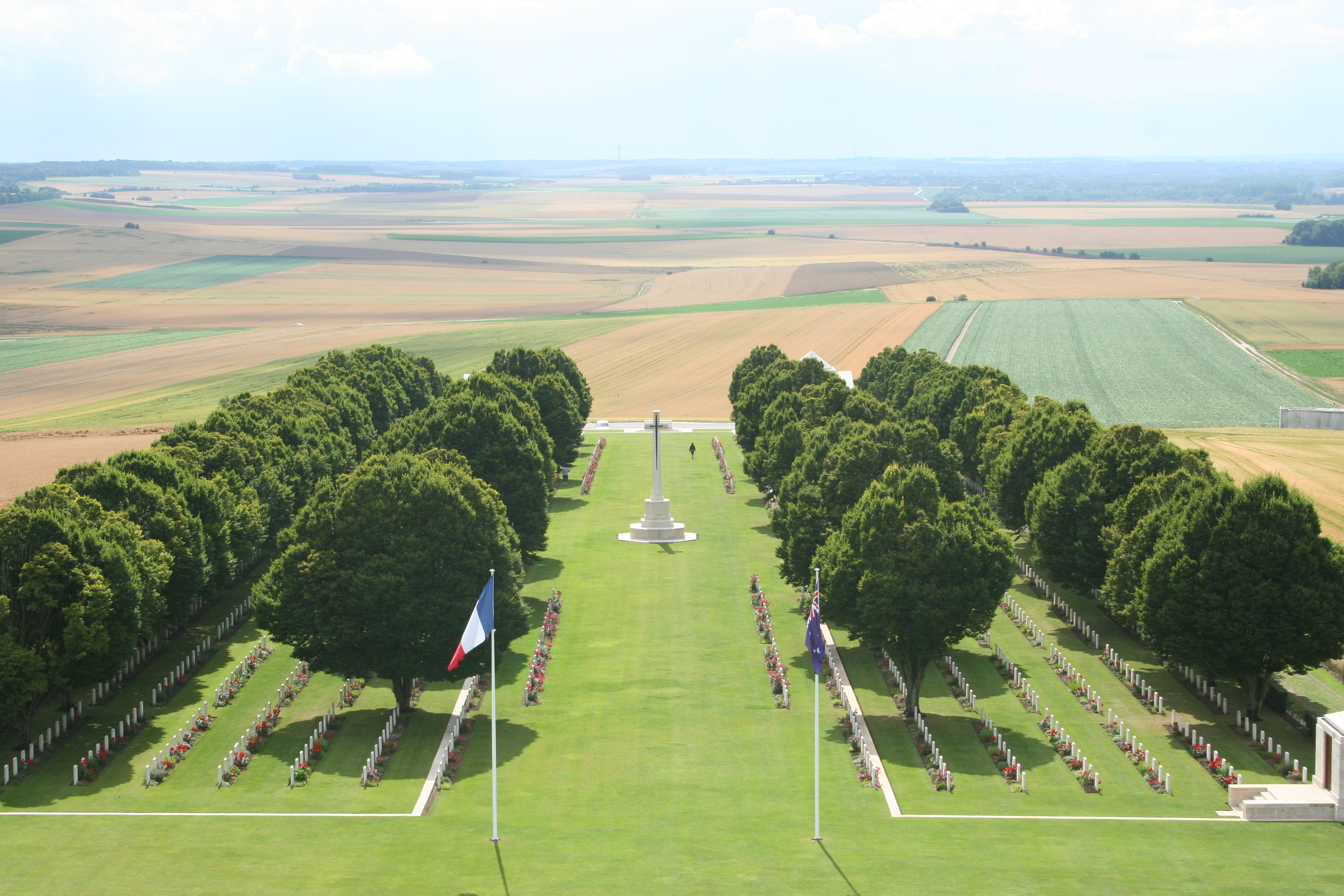
Australian War Memorial Cemetery in Villers-Bretonneux July 2008 – the graves of over 770 Australians, as well as those of other Commonwealth soldiers, lie here.

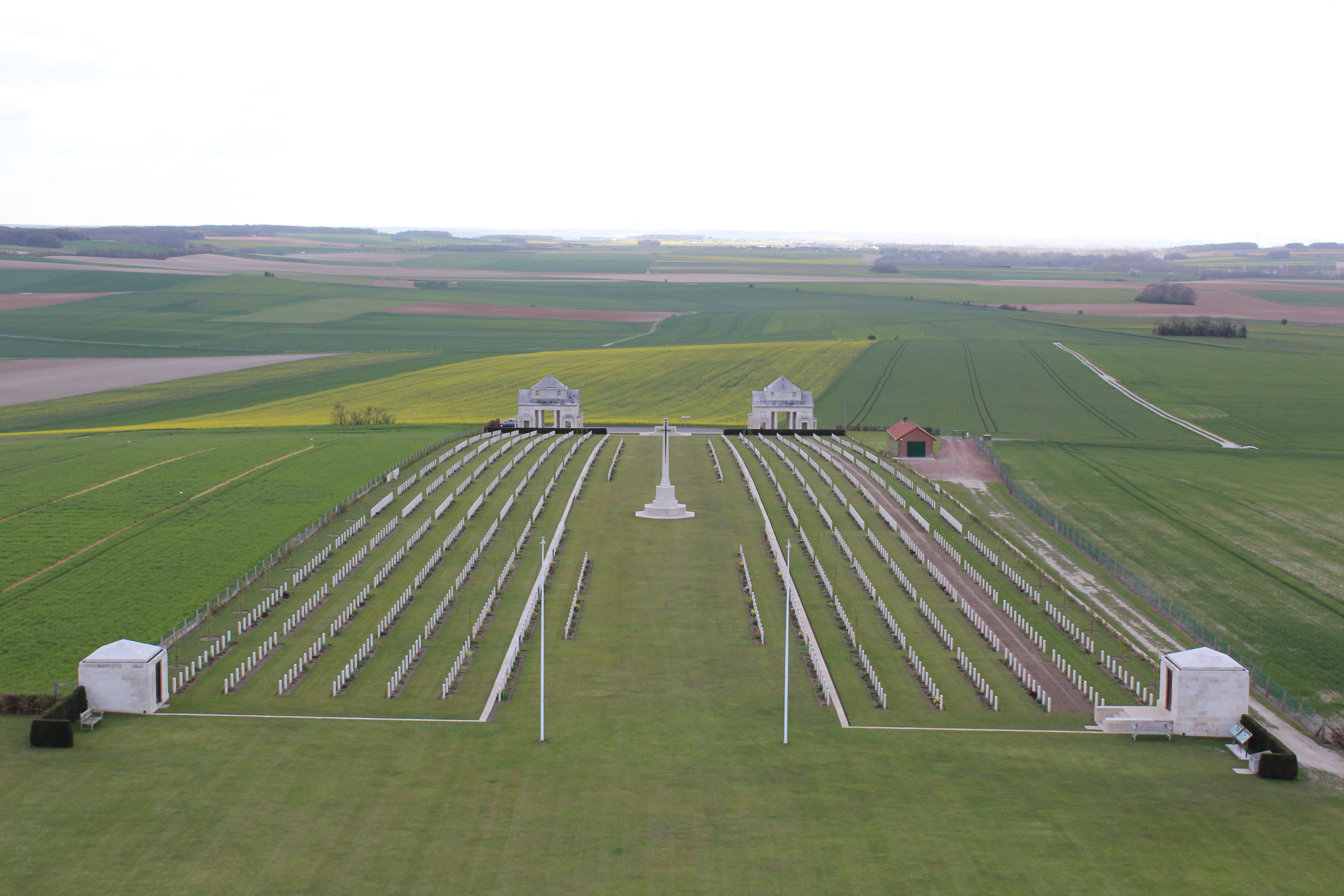
April 2012 AWM Cemetery following removal of trees.

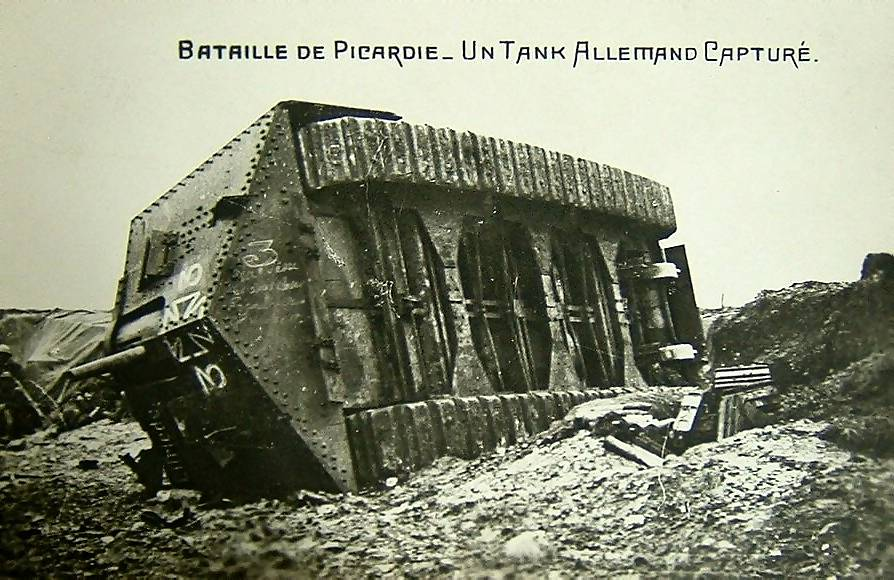
A German tank captured during the First World War

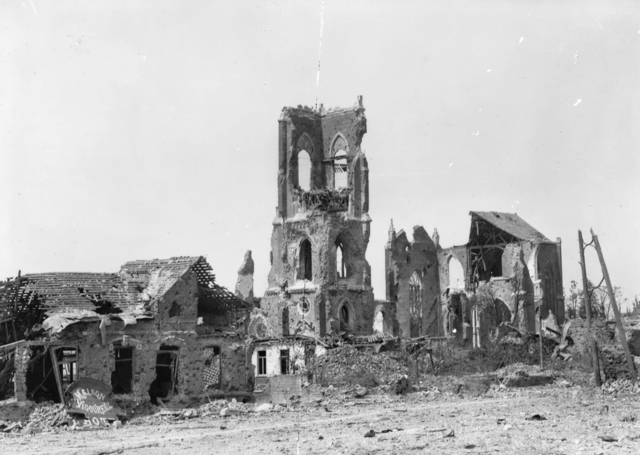
Ruins of the church after the second battle of Villers-Bretonneux in 1918

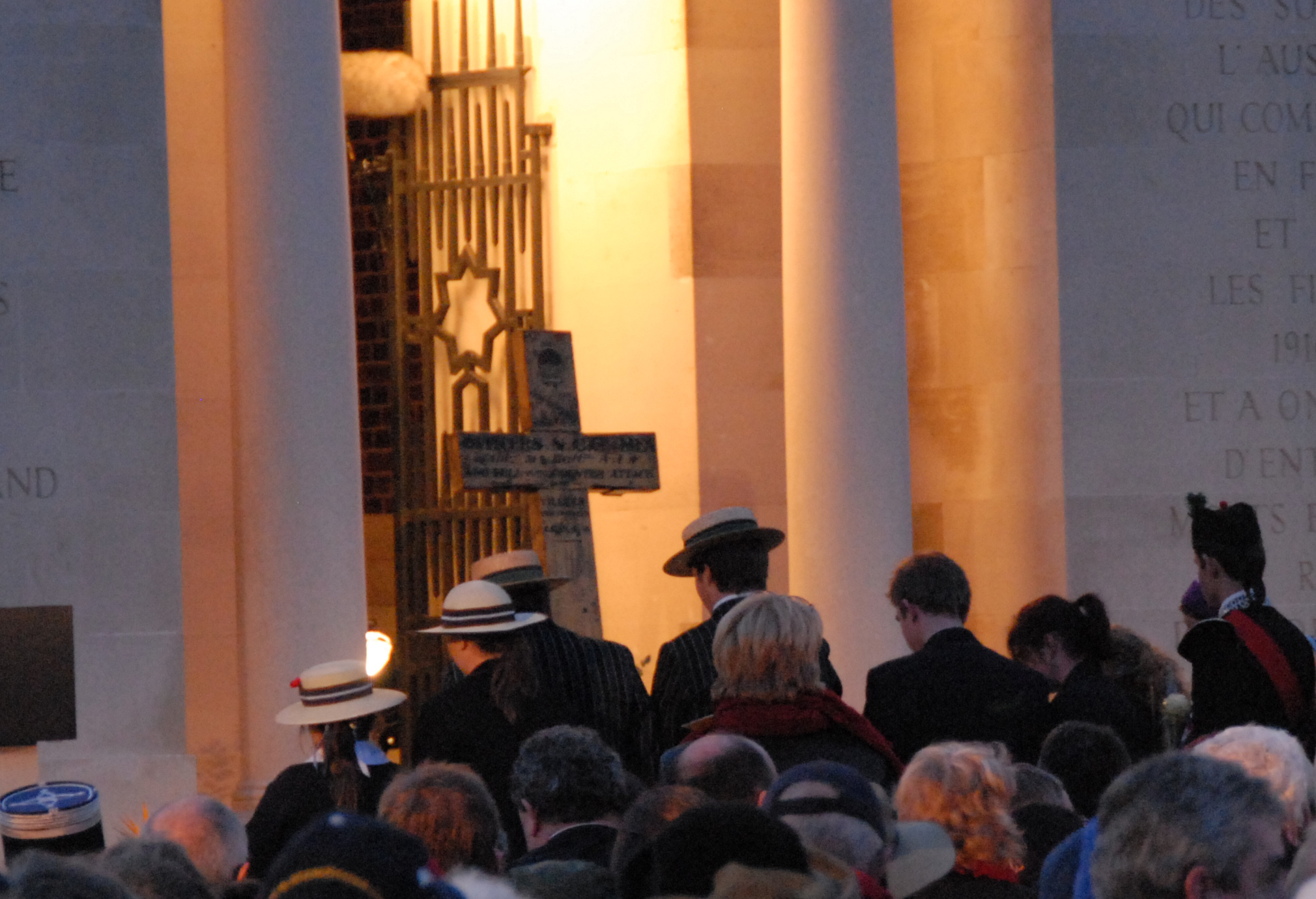
Anzac Day service, 2008
