= Marcelcave =

- Commune
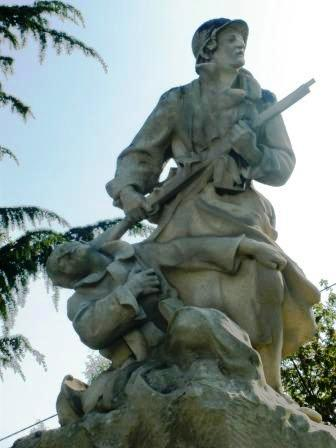
- The war memorial in Marcelcave

- Coat of arms
- Location of Marcelcave
- Location within France Location within Hauts-de-France
- Coordinates: 49°51′03″N 2°34′31″E
- Country: France
- Region: Hauts-de-France
- Department: Somme
- Arrondissement: Amiens
- Canton: Corbie
- Intercommunality: Val de Somme

Government
  - Mayor (2020–2026): Alain Savoie
- Area^{1}: 12.49 km^{2} (4.82 sq mi)
- Elevation: 91 m (299 ft)
- Highest elevation: 102 m (335 ft)
- Lowest elevation: 47 m (154 ft)
- Population (2023): 1,302
  - Density: 104.2/km^{2} (270.0/sq mi)
- Time zone: UTC+01:00 (CET)
  - Summer (DST): UTC+02:00 (CEST)
- INSEE/Postal code: 80507 /80800
- ^{1} French Land Register data, which excludes lakes, ponds, glaciers > 1 km^{2} (0.386 sq mi or 247 acres) and river estuaries.

Marcelcave (French pronunciation: [maʁsɛlkav]) is a commune in the Somme department in Hauts-de-France in northern France.

== Geography ==
Marcelcave is situated on the D42 road, some 15 miles (24 km) east southeast of Amiens. Marcelcave station has rail connections to Amiens and Laon.

== Population ==
Historical population
Year	Pop.	±% p.a.
1968	954	—
1975	919	−0.53%
1982	961	+0.64%
1990	893	−0.91%
1999	977	+1.00%
2007	1,023	+0.58%
2012	1,084	+1.17%
2017	1,239	+2.71%
2023	1,302	+0.83%
Source: INSEE

== See also ==
- Communes of the Somme department
