= Jørgen Jensen (soldier) =

Australian Victoria Cross recipient (1891–1922)

Jørgen Jensen VC
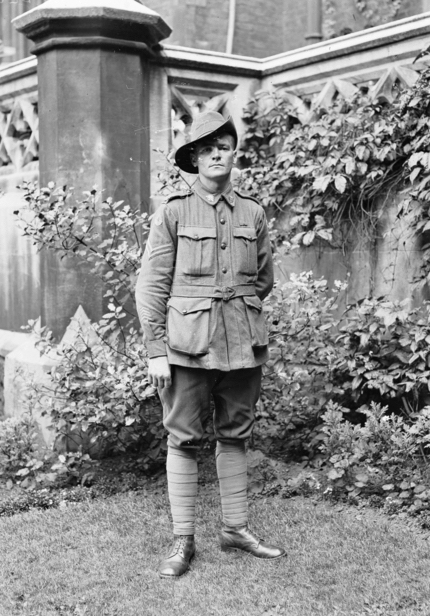
- Corporal Jørgen Jensen, August 1918
- Born: 15 January 1891; Løgstør, Denmark
- Died: 31 May 1922 (aged 31); Adelaide, Australia
- Burial place: West Terrace Cemetery, Adelaide
- Spouse: Katy Herman (née Arthur) (m. 1921)
- Military career
- Allegiance: Australia
- Branch: Australian Imperial Force
- Service years: 1915–1918
- Rank: Corporal
- Units: 10th Battalion (1915–1916); 50th Battalion (1916–1918)
- Conflicts: World War I; Gallipoli Campaign; Western Front; Battle of the Somme; Battle of Pozieres; Battle of Mouquet Farm (WIA); Battle of Messines (WIA); German spring offensive; Second Battle of Dernancourt; Second Battle of Villers-Bretonneux (WIA)
- Awards: Victoria Cross

Jørgen Christian Jensen VC (15 January 1891 – 31 May 1922) was a Danish-born Australian recipient of the Victoria Cross, the highest award for gallantry in battle that could be awarded to a member of the Australian armed forces. Jensen emigrated to Australia in 1909, becoming a British subject at Adelaide, South Australia, in 1914. A sailor and labourer before World War I, he enlisted in the Australian Imperial Force (AIF) in March 1915, serving with the 10th Battalion during the latter stages of the Gallipoli campaign. After the Australian force withdrew to Egypt, Jensen was transferred to the newly formed 50th Battalion, and sailed for France with the unit in June 1916. On the Western Front, he was wounded during the battalion's first serious action, the Battle of Mouquet Farm in August, and only returned to his unit in late January 1917. On 2 April, his battalion attacked the Hindenburg Outpost Line at Noreuil, where his actions leading to the capture of over fifty German soldiers resulted in the award of the Victoria Cross.

In June 1917, the 50th Battalion was involved in the Battle of Messines; the following month, Jensen, now a corporal, was posted to a training unit in the United Kingdom. He returned to his battalion in October, and was promoted to temporary sergeant in November. In March 1918, the German spring offensive was launched, and Jensen fought with his battalion at Dernancourt and Villers-Bretonneux. Shortly after the fighting at Villers-Bretonneux, Jensen was on patrol when he received a severe head wound, and was evacuated to the United Kingdom, then repatriated to Australia, where he was discharged in Adelaide at the end of the war. He worked as a marine store dealer and married in 1921, but died the following year, having never fully recovered from his war wounds.

== Early life ==
Jørgen Christian Jensen was born on 15 January 1891 in Løgstør, Denmark, the son of Jørgen Christian Jensen and Christiane Sørensen, who was apparently also known as Jensen. Sørensen was a single mother who worked in agriculture. The younger Jensen's early life was difficult, but he was a good student, and entered the fishing industry. In 1908, aged 17, he travelled to the United Kingdom before emigrating to Australia. He sailed to Melbourne in March 1909, then moved to Morgan, South Australia, and later Port Pirie, working respectively as a sailor on river steamers on the Murray River, and as a labourer. He was naturalised as a British subject in Adelaide on 7 September 1914.

== World War I ==
On 23 March 1915, Jensen enlisted as a private in the Australian Imperial Force (AIF) for service in World War I; he was allotted to the 6th reinforcements to the 10th Battalion. His reinforcement draft embarked on HMAT Borda at Outer Harbor on 23 June, and joined the battalion at Gallipoli, Turkey, on 4 August. By the time Jensen arrived, nearly half of the battalion had been evacuated sick with dysentery. For the remainder of the Gallipoli campaign, the 10th Battalion rotated through various positions in the line defending the beachhead until withdrawn to Lemnos in November. Jensen remained with his unit throughout, except for a week in September–October that he spent in hospital. The battalion embarked for Egypt in late November and spent the next four months training and assisting in the defence of the Suez Canal. While in Egypt, the battalion was split into two, one half forming the nucleus of the new 50th Battalion, which was part of the 13th Brigade, 4th Division. In April 1916, Jensen and several other 10th Battalion men were transferred to the 50th Battalion; later that month Jensen was charged for not being in his tent at tattoo. On 5 June the battalion embarked for France, arriving in Marseille six days later. The unit then entrained for the Western Front, entering the trenches for the first time on 28 June near Fleurbaix.

The 50th Battalion saw its first serious action during the Battle of Mouquet Farm in mid-August 1916. During the battle, the 50th Battalion suffered 414 casualties, largely from the heavy German artillery bombardment. On 14 August, Jensen was hit in the left shoulder by a piece of shrapnel. He was evacuated to the UK and admitted to Graylingwell War Hospital in Chichester, West Sussex. While in the UK, he was charged with more disciplinary infractions in September, December and January, on one occasion being sentenced to 28 days field punishment for missing the troop train to return to France, and on another serving 12 days detention for being absent without leave. He did not rejoin his unit until 28 January 1917.

The 50th Battalion continued to rotate through front line, support and reserve positions, and underwent training in rear areas. The battalion was also involved in pursuing the Germans as they withdrew to the Hindenburg Line of fortifications. On 2 April, the 13th Brigade attacked the Hindenburg Outpost Line at Noreuil. The attack consisted of the 51st Battalion attacking the village from the north, and the 50th Battalion from the south. During this assault, which was preceded by a weak artillery barrage, the 50th Battalion suffered extraordinary difficulties, and the centre company, to which Jensen belonged, was forced to detach a party of men equipped with a large number of hand grenades (then known as bombs) to deal with a strongly barricaded German post that was holding out between their company and the one on their right. Jensen was a member of this party. His actions during the reduction of this post resulted in a recommendation for the Victoria Cross, the highest award for gallantry in battle that could be awarded to a member of the Australian armed forces at that time. He was assisted in his actions by Private William Quinlan O'Connor and four others. The recommendation read:

At Noreuil on 2nd April 1917, this man took charge of five men and attacked a barricade behind which were 40/50 Germans with a machine gun. One of his men shot down the German gunner. Jensen who is a Dane, then rushed the whole post singlehanded and threw a bomb in. He had still a bomb in one hand and taking another from his pocket he drew the pin with his teeth. Threatening them with two bombs, he called on them in German to surrender and bluffed them that they were surrounded by Australians. The enemy dropped their rifles and gave in. Jensen then sent a German to tell another enemy party who were fighting our Stokes Gun to surrender and they too gave in. A different party of our men then saw these Germans for the first time and began firing on them. At considerable risk, Jensen stood up on the barricade, waved his helmet, and sent the German prisoners back to our line under an escort of lightly wounded men.

During the assault on Noreuil, Jensen also freed Australian prisoners, and assisted in the "mopping-up" of German resistance in the village itself when he captured a German officer or non-commissioned officer, who pointed out which building the fire was coming from. The 50th Battalion suffered 360 casualties, including 95 dead, and captured 70 Germans, nearly all of whom were taken by Jensen and his party. O'Connor was awarded the Distinguished Conduct Medal for his part in capturing the German post. On 4 April, Jensen was promoted to lance corporal. His award of the Victoria Cross appeared in The London Gazette on 8 June, by which time the 50th Battalion was involved in the Battle of Messines, suffering 149 casualties. After being relieved, the battalion continued its rotation through front line, support and reserve positions.

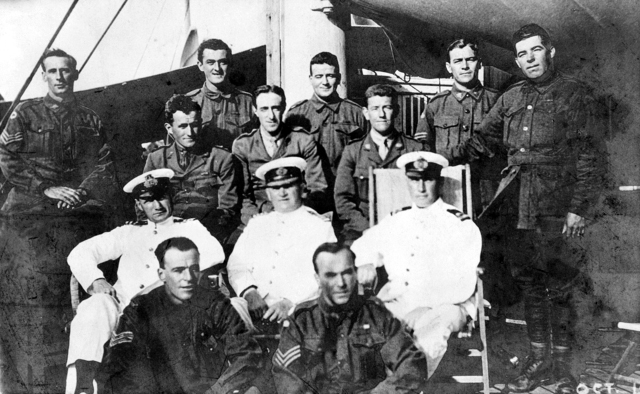
Jensen (standing second from right), during his repatriation to Australia in August 1918, along with nine other VC recipients

In July 1917, Jensen was temporarily promoted to corporal and transferred to the 13th Training Battalion at Codford in the UK as an instructor. While there, he was entertained by Danish residents of Kingston upon Hull. He was invested with his VC by King George V at Buckingham Palace on 21 July. After another disciplinary infringement, he returned to France, rejoining his battalion on 6 October. He was temporarily promoted to sergeant in early November, and the battalion spent the winter of 1917–18 rotating through the front line. In late March 1918, the battalion left its rest area and, along with many other Australian units, was quickly deployed to meet the German spring offensive south of the River Ancre. On 5 April, the battalion took up positions at Dernancourt and there contributed to the defeat of the "largest German attack mounted against Australian troops during the war" during the Second Battle of Dernancourt.

The fighting at Dernancourt was followed by a move to the Villers-Bretonneux sector, where, on 25 April, the battalion took part in the Second Battle of Villers-Bretonneux that drove the Germans from that village, at a cost to the battalion of 254 casualties. On 5 May, Jensen was on patrol near Villers-Bretonneux when he was shot in the head. Severely wounded, he was admitted to hospital in France, and on 18 May was evacuated to the UK, where he was admitted to the Richmond Military Hospital in Surrey.

Jensen reverted to the rank of corporal on being evacuated. Following two weeks' leave, he was repatriated to Australia, along with nine other Victoria Cross recipients, in August 1918 to take part in a recruiting campaign on the invitation of Prime Minister Billy Hughes. He disembarked in Adelaide on 11 October, and was discharged from the AIF on 2 December. He was assessed to be partially disabled, and received a small pension. For his service during the war, as well as his Victoria Cross he was issued the 1914–15 Star, British War Medal and Victory Medal.

== Post-war ==
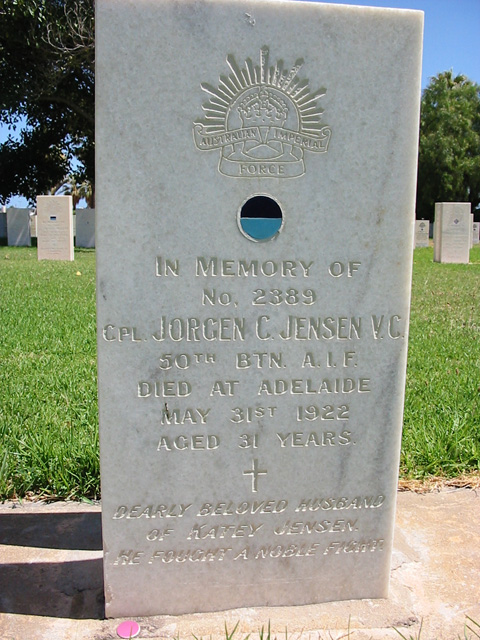
Grave marker of Jørgen Jensen at the West Terrace AIF Cemetery, Adelaide

After his discharge, Jensen worked for a short time as a barman in Truro, then as a marine store dealer in Adelaide. He married Katy Herman (née Arthur), a divorcée, at the Adelaide Registry Office on 13 July 1921. Their marriage was heavily affected by his wartime experiences. In April 1922, a photograph of Jensen and his horse-drawn cart, with "J. C. Jensen V.C." painted on the side, was published on the front page of The Sunday Times newspaper in Sydney; the caption noted that he employed several men in his business. On 28 May 1922, Jensen was admitted to the Adelaide Hospital, and died of congestion of the lungs three days later, aged 31. He had never fully recovered from the wounds he had received during the war.

On 2 June 1922, Jensen's casket was carried on a horse-drawn gun carriage to the West Terrace Cemetery, followed by hundreds of former members of the 50th Battalion, and he was buried with full military honours in the AIF section of the cemetery. It was reported as "one of the most impressive funerals which have passed through the gates of the West Terrace Cemetery", and "probably one of the largest military funerals ever held in Adelaide". The pastor at the service said that Jensen was, "modest always... ever ready to enlarge on the bravery of others, without touching on his own accomplishments".

Jensen's medal set, including his Victoria Cross, was donated by a family member to the Australian War Memorial in 1987 at a ceremony attended by Queen Margrethe II of Denmark, and is displayed in the Hall of Valour of the memorial. In 2006, a memorial to Jensen was unveiled in Løgstør by the Australian ambassador to Denmark, and a book about him was published in Denmark in the same year. Each year, wreaths are placed at the memorial in memory of Jensen, and in 2014 a wreath was placed by the Australian ambassador, Damien Miller.
