= 52nd Battalion (Australia) =

Australian Army infantry battalion

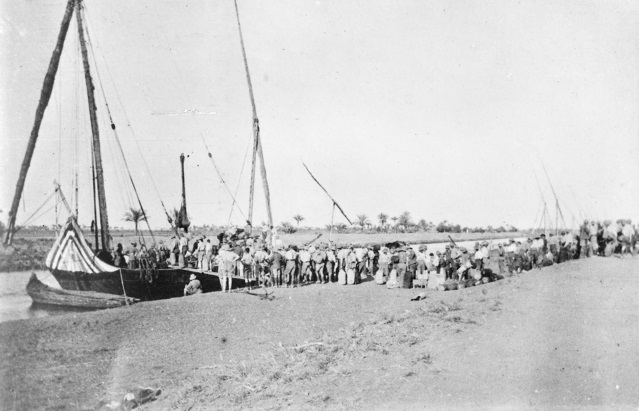
- Troops from the 52nd Battalion in Egypt, March 1916
- Active: 1916–1918; 1921–1930; 1936–1942
- Country: Australia
- Branch: Army
- Type: Infantry
- Size: ~900–1,000 personnel
- Part of: 13th Brigade, 4th Division; 10th Brigade, 3rd Division
- Engagements: World War I: Western Front; World War II

Insignia
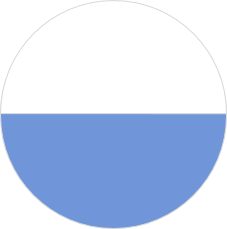
- Unit colour patch

The 52nd Battalion was an infantry battalion of the Australian Army. It was originally raised in 1916 as part of the Australian Imperial Force for service during World War I. After training in Egypt, the battalion took part in the fighting in the trenches of the Western Front in France and Belgium, including major battles at Mouquet Farm, Messines, Polygon Wood, Dernancourt and Villers-Bretonneux. In May 1918, the battalion was disbanded to provide reinforcements for other depleted Australian units. After the war, the battalion was re-raised as a part-time unit in Victoria in 1921 and served until 1930 when it was amalgamated with the 37th Battalion to become the 37th/52nd Battalion. In 1936, the battalion was re-formed and during the early part of World War II it undertook garrison duties in Australia before being merged once again with the 37th Battalion in 1942.

== History ==
=== World War I ===
The 52nd Battalion was originally raised in Egypt on 1 March 1916 as part of the reorganisation and expansion of the Australian Imperial Force (AIF) following the Gallipoli campaign. This was achieved by transferring cadres of experienced personnel predominately from the 1st Division to the newly formed battalions and combining them with recently recruited personnel who had been dispatched as reinforcements from Australia. With an authorised strength of just over 1,000 men of all ranks, the unit's first intake of personnel were drawn from men originating from South Australia, Western Australia and Tasmania, some of whom had already served with the 12th Battalion. Under the command of Lieutenant Colonel Miles Fitzroy Beevor, the veterans were bolstered by a large number of new recruits, who were mainly drawn from Queensland. The battalion became part of the 13th Brigade attached to the 4th Australian Division.

An intense period of training followed, but in mid-1916 the AIF's infantry units were sent to Europe to fight on the Western Front. Sailing on the transport ship HMT Ivernia, the battalion departed Alexandria and landed in Marseille on 11 June 1916, and was then moved by rail to northern France where they undertook gas training and received new equipment to prepare them for trench warfare. A period of acclimatisation followed in a "nursery sector" around Petillon before, in mid-August the battalion played a support role in the initial fighting during the Battle of Mouquet Farm, before being committed to the fighting for the first time, launching an attack in early September. Assigned to the centre of the 13th Brigade's attack, the majority of 52nd Battalion was tasked with capturing the Fabeck Graben, while two platoons assisted with the drive towards Mouquet Farm. The battalion briefly managed to secure its objective, before being forced back. The attack resulted in heavy casualties, with the battalion losing nine officers and 170 other ranks. Amongst those killed from the 52nd Battalion during the fighting around Mouquet Farm were three brothers: Thomas, Wilf and Hurtle Potter. A fourth member of the family, Ralph, was also wounded in the battle, and invalided back to Australia.

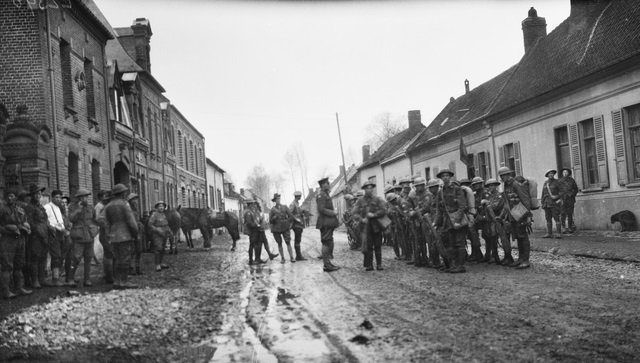
Troops from the 52nd Battalion after the fighting around Dernancourt, April 1918

Following the fighting around Mouquet Farm, the 13th Brigade was withdrawn for rest around Ypres. The 52nd Battalion did not take part in any significant attacks for the remainder of the year. In early 1917, after a bitter winter, the Germans withdrew to the defences of the Hindenburg Line in an effort to shorten their lines and free up a pool of reserves. A brief advance followed as the Allies pursued them, during which the 52nd took part in an action around Noreuil on 2 April. Later, after they were moved to the Ypres salient in Belgium they fought around Messines in early June and then, in late September, during the Battle of Polygon Wood.

In early 1918, following the collapse of Russia, the Germans launched the Spring Offensive on the Western Front. As the Allies were pushed back in the direction of Paris, the units of the Australian 4th Division were rushed south from Belgium where they had spent the winter. Moving in to a hasty defensive line north-west of the Ancre River, between Buire and Dernancourt, the battalion helped to blunt the German advance during a defensive battle at Dernancourt on 5 April 1918. The battalion remained in the line until relieved on the evening of 6/7 April; the action cost the battalion 154 casualties, of which 30 were killed. Later that month, as the German offensive approached the vital railhead at Amiens, the battalion took part in an Allied counter-attack at Villers-Bretonneux, commencing late in the evening of 24 April 1918. Two battalions of the 13th Brigade, the 51st and 52nd, were assigned to a thrust south of the town, driving eastwards towards Monument Wood, from a start line between Cachy and Aquenne Wood. By the morning of 25 April, they were short of the objective around Monument Wood, but were tied in to the north of British troops. Early following day, the battalion was relieved by French Zouaves who continued the attack while the Australians moved back to Blangy–Tronville. The attack cost the battalion between 237 and 245 casualties.

The Australian Corps suffered heavy casualties during the Spring Offensive and, as a result, the AIF was reorganised. As a part of this, three battalions were disbanded to provide reinforcements for those that remained. The 52nd Battalion was one of those chosen and it was disbanded on 16 May 1918. Its personnel were distributed amongst the 49th, 50th and 51st Battalions, with these units, the men of the 52nd subsequently took part in the Allied Hundred Days Offensive in August, seeing further action as Australians advanced against the Hindenburg Line's outpost line in September and early October. After this, the Australians were withdrawn from the line for rest and further reorganisation and they did not see further action until the war ended in November 1918. During the fighting, the battalion suffered 650 killed in action or died on active service, and 1,438 wounded. Members of the battalion received the following decorations: two Distinguished Service Orders (DSO), 17 Military Crosses (MCs) with one Bar, eight Distinguished Conduct Medals (DCMs), 88 Military Medals (MMs) with one Bar, one Meritorious Service Medal (MSMs), 20 Mentions in Despatches (MIDs) and five foreign awards. A total of 12 battle honours were awarded to the 52nd Battalion in 1927 for its war service.

=== Inter-war years and World War II ===
In 1921, Australia's part-time military force, the Citizen Forces, was reorganised to perpetuate the numerical designations of the AIF. Shortly after this, the 52nd Battalion was re-raised in Victoria through the redesignation of the 48th Battalion, which was subsequently re-formed in South Australia. At this time, the battalion was assigned a recruitment area between Caulfield, Dandenong and Gippsland, and was commanded by Lieutenant Colonel George Knox. In 1925, the battalion was presented colours and battle honours for its service during World War I, and an honorary distinction for South Africa 1899–1902, which it bore for the 2nd Battalion, Tasmanian Infantry Regiment, which it was linked to through its parent battalion, the 12th, from which it had been raised in 1916. In 1927, the battalion became known as "The Gippsland Regiment" after territorial designations were introduced. At the same time it adopted the motto of "Always Ready".

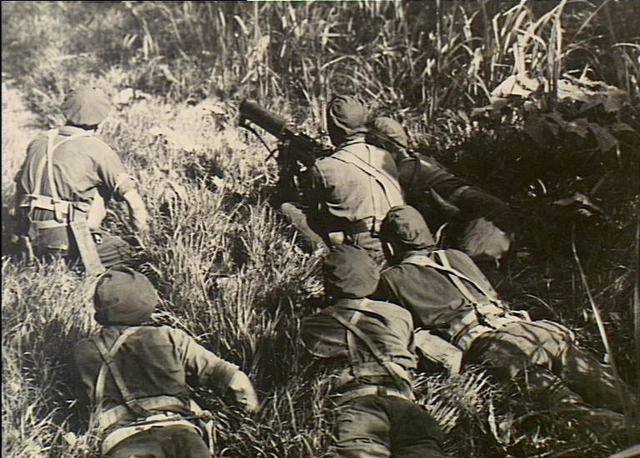
A machine-gun crew from the 37th/52nd Battalion in New Guinea, 1944

The battalion was amalgamated with the 37th Battalion, known as the "37th/52nd Battalion, The Henty Regiment", was formed in Victoria in 1930 as part of a rationalisation of the Australia's part-time military forces that came about as a result of the combined effects of the suspension of compulsory service by the newly elected Scullin Labor government and the Great Depression. Assigned to the 10th Brigade, the amalgamated battalion undertook weekly parades and undertook annual camps, and remained in existence until mid-1936 when, as part of an expansion of the Australian military due to concerns about the threat of war in Europe, the battalion was split to reform its predecessor units.

During the early years of World War II, the battalion remained in Australia undertaking garrison duties as part of the 10th Brigade, assigned to the 3rd Division. Although precluded from being sent overseas as a unit due to the provisions of the Defence Act, many 52nd Battalion personnel volunteered to join the Second Australian Imperial Force, serving mainly in the 2/5th and 2/7th Battalions, while others joined the Royal Australian Air Force or Royal Australian Navy. In January 1940, the battalion concentrated at Trawool where it undertook a three-month period of continuous service designed to improve the Militia's readiness and provide training to conscripts that had been called up under the Universal Training Scheme that had been re-established. Further periods of continuous service were undertaken between December 1940 and April 1941, and between August and October 1941 at Nagambie Road.

Following Japan's entry into the war in December 1941, the battalion was mobilised for war service. In early 1942, when concerns about a Japanese invasion of Australia heightened, the battalion, consisting of 44 officers and 890 other ranks, was moved to Jimboomba, in Queensland, from Bonegilla. The invasion did not eventuate and the government decided to demobilise part of the military to rectify a manpower shortage that developed in the Australian economy. As a result, on 27 August 1942, the 52nd Battalion was once again amalgamated with the 37th Battalion to form the 37th/52nd Battalion, and some of its personnel were released back to civilian industry. The 10th Brigade was disbanded around this time, and subsequently the 37th/52nd Battalion was assigned to the 4th Brigade. Together the amalgamated battalion subsequently served in the Huon Peninsula and New Britain campaigns in 1944 and 1945 before being disbanded on 12 June 1946.

== Battle honours ==
The 52nd Battalion was awarded the following battle honours:

- South Africa 1899–1902 (inherited);
- World War I: Somme 1916–18, Pozières, Bullecourt, Ypres 1917, Menin Road, Polygon Wood, Passchendaele, Ancre 1918, Villers-Bretonneux, France and Flanders 1916–18, Egypt 1916.
