= 23rd Regiment, Royal Australian Artillery =

Military unit (1948–2018)

- Active: 1948–2018
- Country: Australia
- Branch: Australian Army
- Type: Royal Australian Artillery
- Part of: 2nd Division

Insignia
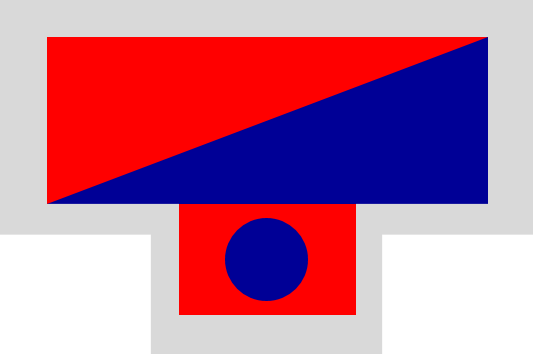
- Unit colour patch

The 23rd Regiment, Royal Australian Artillery was an Australian Army artillery regiment of the Australian Army. Raised in 1948 as a Citizen Military Forces anti-tank unit designated the 3rd Anti-Tank Regiment, it was converted to a field artillery regiment in the 1950s. It supported the 5th Brigade until being reduced to a battery-sized sub unit, and assigned to the 9th Regiment, Royal Australian Artillery in 2018.

== History ==
In 1948, the part-time Citizens Military Force was re-raised following the demobilisation of the wartime military forces. At this time, the 3rd Anti-Tank Regiment raised in New South Wales as part of the 2nd Division. Under the command of Lieutenant Colonel John Argent, the regiment perpetuated the 2/3rd Anti-Tank Regiment, which had been raised during World War II. On raising, the regiment had depots at Belmore, Homebush and Ashfield. In 1951, the regiment was converted to a new role as a field artillery regiment, and was re-designated as the 3rd Light Regiment. By 1953, the regiment was under the command of Lieutenant Colonel T.A. Harris.

The regiment assumed the designation of the 23rd Light Regiment in 1956, and then the 23rd Field Regiment in 1957; at this time it was equipped with Ordnance QF 25-pounder field guns. This numerical designation replicated the designation of the 23rd Australian Field Artillery (Howitzer) Brigade that had served as part of the 3rd Division on the Western Front from 1916 until early 1917 when it was disbanded as part of a reorganisation to consolidate the number of guns within each battery and reduce the number of artillery brigades in each division. Plans had been made to raise this unit again as the 23rd Field Regiment during World War II from Y Troop, 18th Field Battery, which had been raised as reinforcements for the Darwin Mobile Force, but these plans were cancelled in June 1942.

The regiment began operating 105 mm field guns in 1965, and adopted the L119 Hamel 105 mm field gun, in support of the 5th Brigade, which was assigned to the 2nd Division. By 1976, the regiment was combined to form the 18th/23rd Field Regiment, under the command of Lieutenant Colonel S.P. Wheeler; it later returned to the designation of the 23rd Field Regiment.

In 2011, the regiment fired a 21-gun salute near Sydney Harbour to commemorate Australia Day along with the 7th Field Regiment, Royal Australian Artillery. Later that year, it was re-designated as the 23rd Regiment, Royal Australian Artillery. In 2012, the regiment converted to the L16 81mm mortar as the Army Reserve artillery units were converted to the light support role. Throughout the 2000s, the regiment had depots in Kogarah, Sutherland, Holsworthy and Canberra, and deployed personnel in support of operations in the Solomon Islands, East Timor, Iraq and Afghanistan.

The regiment was subsequently reduced to a battery and in 2018 became part of the 9th Regiment, Royal Australian Artillery.
