= 37th Battalion (Australia) =

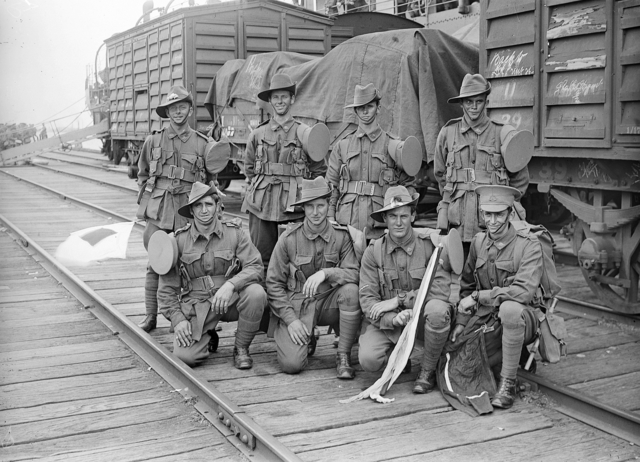
- 37th Battalion reinforcements in Melbourne, February 1917
- Active: 1916–1919; 1921–1930; 1939–1942
- Country: Australia
- Branch: Australian Army
- Type: Infantry
- Size: ~800–1,000 officers and men (Note: During World War I, the authorised strength of an Australian infantry battalion was 1,023 men. By the start of World War II, it was 910 men all ranks, however, later in the war it fell to 803.)
- Part of: 10th Brigade, 3rd Division (World War I); 4th Brigade, 5th Division (World War II)
- Colours: Black over red
- Engagements: World War I: Western Front; World War II

Insignia
- Unit colour patch

The 37th Battalion was an infantry battalion of the Australian Army. It was originally raised in 1916 for service during the World War I and took part in the fighting in the trenches of the Western Front in France and Belgium and was disbanded in 1918. In 1921, the battalion was re-raised as part of the part-time Citizens Forces, although it was later amalgamated with the 52nd Battalion in 1930 due to manpower shortages. In 1937, the battalion was briefly re-raised in its own right before being amalgamated with the 39th Battalion. It later returned to the order of battle in its own right as the Australian military was expanded due to concerns of a future war in Europe. Following the outbreak of World War II, the 37th Battalion served in a garrison role until 1942 when it was once again amalgamated with the 52nd Battalion.

== History ==
=== World War I ===
The 37th Battalion was originally raised in Seymour, Victoria, in February 1916 as part of an expansion of the Australian Imperial Force (AIF) which took place following the end of the Gallipoli campaign. The unit was made up from personnel drawn from men originating from Victoria who were recruited from a number of areas including Melbourne, Gippsland and the north-eastern parts of the state. Under the command of Lieutenant Colonel Frederick George Woods, the battalion became part of the 10th Brigade attached to the 3rd Australian Division.

Initial training took place in Australia, however, once this was complete the battalion was sent to Britain where they concentrated on Salisbury Plain along with the rest of the 3rd Division to undertake more advanced training. The process took a considerable period of time and as such it was not until late in the year that the 3rd Division was declared ready to be deployed to the Western Front. After the battalion arrived in France on 23 November 1916, it was first sent to the Armentières sector which was considered a "quiet" area where the newly arrived troops could gain their first experiences of trench warfare. While there, they undertook patrols into No Man's Land and minor raids on the German trenches opposite them during the winter months.

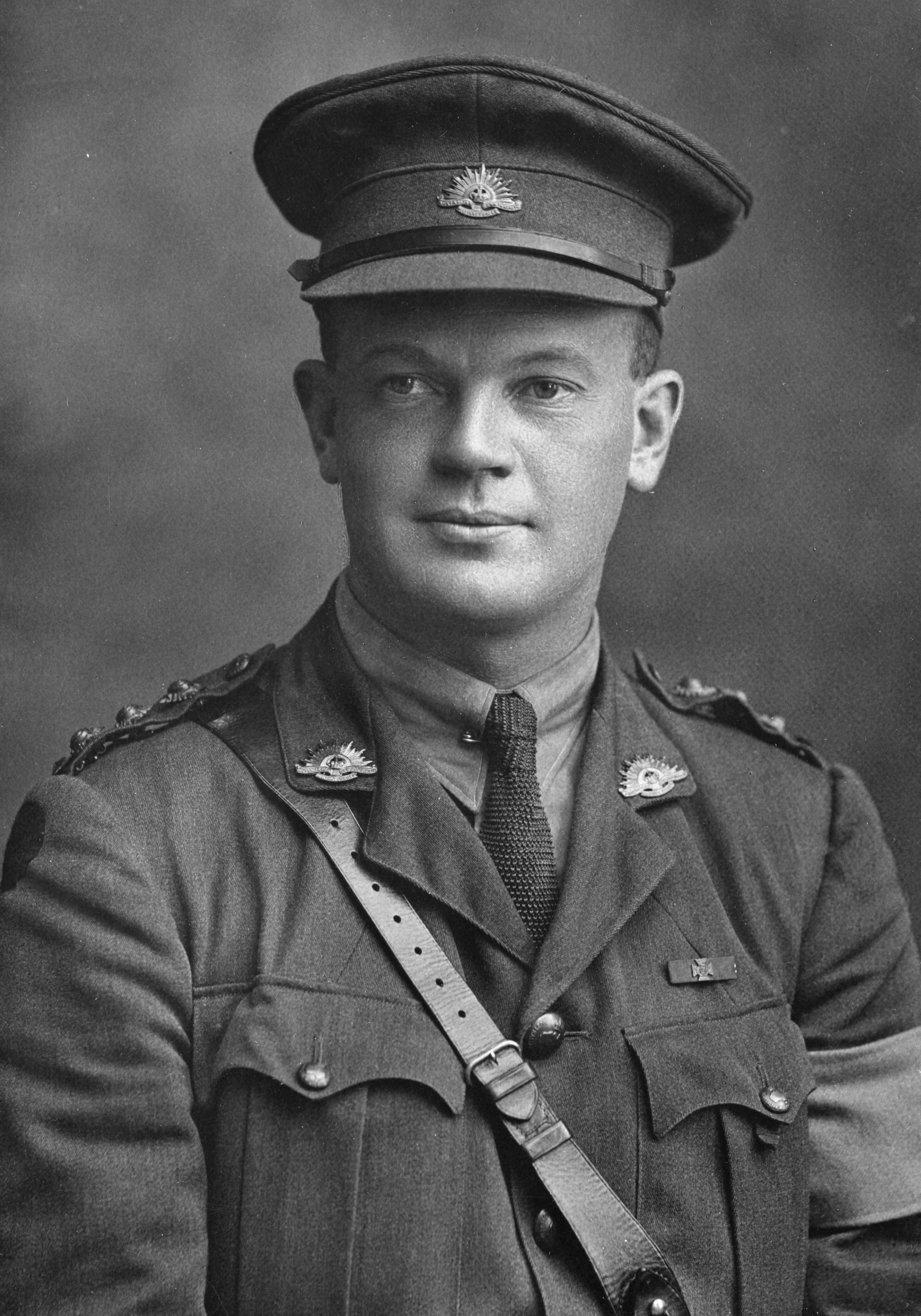
Captain Robert Grieve, who received the 37th Battalion's only Victoria Cross

After winter had subsided, in April 1917 the 3rd Division was moved to the Messines–Wytschaete Ridge section of the line in Belgium, where they began to prepare to take part in their first major battle of the war. Between 7 and 9 June 1917, the battalion took part in the fighting at Messines in Belgium. One of the battalion's officers, Captain Robert Grieve was later awarded the Victoria Cross for the role he played in the battle. Following this, the 37th Battalion saw service at Broodseinde on 4 October and then later at Passchendaele on 12 October.

In early 1918, the collapse of the Russian resistance on the Eastern Front enabled the Germans to transfer a large number of troops to the west. (Note: At 30 November 1917, there were 160 German divisions on the Western Front. Following the Treaty of Brest-Litovsk, this rose to 208.) As a result, in March, they launched an offensive along the Western Front. The initial attack was quite successful and with the Germans making rapid gains, many Australian units, including the 37th Battalion, which was moved from Armentières and to Ypres, were thrown into the line to blunt the attack. In late March, the battalion took part in a defensive action around Dernancourt. Finally the German offensive stalled and, after a period, the Allies were able to launch their own offensive, known as the Hundred Days Offensive, which ultimately brought about an end to the war.

Held in reserve initially, the 37th Battalion did not see action on the first or second days of the fighting. On 10 August, however, the battalion participated in a poorly planned attack on the village of Proyart, which ended in failure. After this, it took part in a number of actions, including those at Bray and Clery, as the 3rd Division advanced through the Somme Valley towards Buire. As a result of heavy casualties sustained by the AIF during 1918 and a lack of new recruits with which to make up these losses, in September the AIF was forced to disband a number of battalions in order to reinforce others. With orders to disband, the battalion commander, Lieutenant Colonel Charles Story, was relieved of command for questioning and failing to follow the order. The men mutinied and, as a result, the order was rescinded, albeit on a temporary basis. On 29 September, the battalion took part in its final battle of the war when it was involved in the attack on the St Quentin Canal. After this, the battalion was finally disbanded on 12 October 1918, at which point it only had a frontage of 60 men.

During the fighting, it suffered lost 483 killed in action or died on active service and 1,485 wounded. Members of the battalion received the following decorations: one Victoria Cross, two Distinguished Service Orders (DSO), 15 Military Crosses (MCs), 8 Distinguished Conduct Medals (DCMs), 67 Military Medals (MMs) with one Bar, six Meritorious Service Medals (MSMs), 13 Mentions in Despatches (MIDs) and two foreign awards. The 37th was awarded 14 battle honours for its involvement in the fighting on the Western Front.

=== Inter-war years ===
In 1921, Australia's part-time military forces were re-organised in order to perpetuate the numerical designations and formations of the AIF. As a result, the 37th Battalion was re-raised at this time, drawing personnel from parts of the 24th, 46th and 37th Infantry Regiments and the 29th Light Horse, and was assigned to the 10th Brigade, which was attached to the 3rd Division. In 1927, when territorial designations were adopted, the battalion became known as '"The Henty Regiment". That year, the 37th adopted the motto of "Indivisible". The battalion was amalgamated with the 52nd Battalion in 1930 as the "37th/52nd Battalion (The Henty Regiment)", which was formed in the state of Victoria as part of a rationalisation of the Australia's part-time military forces that came about as a result of the combined effects of the suspension of compulsory service by the newly elected Scullin Labor government and the Great Depression. The 37th/52nd Battalion remained in existence until 1937 when, as part of an expansion of the Australian military due to concerns about the threat of war in Europe, the battalion was split, and the 37th Battalion was amalgamated with the 39th Battalion; this remained until 24 August 1939 when the 37th was re-formed as the 37th Battalion (East Gippsland Regiment) with the Headquarters moving to Sale. While the 39th Battalion was amalgamated with the 24th Battalion. An alliance with the Queen's Own Cameron Highlanders was approved in the inter-war years.

=== World War II ===
At the outbreak of World War II in September 1939, the 37th Battalion (East Gippsland Regiment) was headquartered around Sale, in Victoria, where it formed part of the 10th Brigade. Due to the provisions of the Defence Act (1903), which precluded sending the Militia outside Australian territory, initially units such as the 37th Battalion were employed to provide training for personnel called up under the compulsory training scheme, which was reactivated in 1940. As a result, throughout 1940–41, as the Militia were called up to undertake periods of continuous training, the 37th Battalion undertook a number of training camps at Seymour. Following Japan's entry into the war in late 1941, they the units of the 3rd Division were mobilised for war service. In August 1942, however, having remained in Australia carrying out garrison duties and having not been deployed on active service overseas, the battalion was again amalgamated with the 52nd Battalion, this time in response to a manpower shortage in the Australian economy that had been brought about by an over mobilisation of Australia's military forces. At this point the battalion became known as the "37th/52nd Battalion" and initially, it was assigned to the 10th Brigade and attached to the 3rd Division, although it was later transferred to the 4th Brigade in September 1942 after the 10th Brigade was also disbanded. The 37th/52nd was disbanded after the war on 12 June 1946, having fought against the Japanese in the Huon Peninsula and New Britain campaigns.

== Battle honours ==
The 37th Battalion was awarded the following battle honours:

- World War I: Messines 1917, Ypres 1917, Polygon Wood, Broodseinde, Poelcappelle, Passchendaele, Somme 1918, Ancre 1918, Amiens, Albert 1918, Mont St Quentin, Hindenburg Line, St Quentin Canal, France and Flanders 1916–18.

== Commanding officers ==
The following officers commanded the battalion during World War I:

- Lieutenant Colonel Frederick George Woods
- Lieutenant Colonel Walter John Smith

The following officers commanded the battalion during World War II:

- Lieutenant Colonel Albert William John Stewart
- Lieutenant Colonel John Patrick Minogue
- Lieutenant Colonel John George Rowan

== Notes ==
Footnotes

Citations
