= 10th Brigade (Australia) =

Formation of the Australian Army

- Active: 1912–1919; 1921–1942; 2024–present
- Country: Australia
- Branch: Australian Army
- Role: Long range fires
- Part of: 1st (Australian) Division
- Garrison/HQ: RAAF Base Edinburgh
- Equipment: NASAMS; HIMARS
- Engagements: First World War: Western Front

Commanders
- Current commander: Nick Wilson CSC
- Notable commanders: Stanley Savige; Raymond Tovell; Thomas Blamey

Insignia
- Unit colour patch

The 10th Brigade, more commonly referred to as the Long-Range Fires Brigade is a fires brigade of the Australian Army that was re-raised in January 2024 to operate the Army's High Mobility Rocket System (HIMARS) and National Advanced Surface-to-Air Missile System (NASAMS).

Originally formed in 1912 as a Militia formation, the brigade was re-raised in 1916 as part of the expansion of the Australian Imperial Force following the end of the Gallipoli campaign. It subsequently saw service on the Western Front in France and Belgium during the First World War. After the war it was disbanded but was re-raised in 1921 as a part-time formation based in the state of Victoria. During the Second World War, the brigade was used in a garrison role in Australia before being disbanded in 1942.

The brigade was reinstated in 2024 to be responsible for the army's long-range strike and missile defence capabilities.

== History ==
The 10th Brigade traces its origins to 1912, when it was formed as a Militia brigade as part of the introduction of the compulsory training scheme, assigned to the 2nd Military District. At this time, the brigade's constituent units were located around New South Wales including Bulli, Wollongong, Nowra, Rockdale, Kogarah, Ashfield, Canterbury, Burwood and Rookwood.

=== First World War ===
The 10th Brigade was re-formed in 1916 as an Australian Imperial Force (AIF) formation for service during the First World War. Assigned to the 3rd Division, upon formation it consisted of four battalions—the 37th, 38th, 39th and 40th Battalions—which were raised in Victoria and Tasmania. In July 1916, the brigade sailed to England where it undertook further training before being committed to the fighting on the Western Front in late 1916. A period of acclimatization followed in a "nursery sector" around Armentières where the newly arrived troops undertook patrols into No Man's Land and minor raids on the German trenches opposite them during the winter months.

In early 1917, the brigade moved to the Messines–Wytschaete Ridge section of the front line in Belgium, where they began to prepare to take part in their first major battle of the war. Throughout the year, the brigade took part in the fighting at Messines in June, the Battle of Broodseinde in early October and then later the Battle of Passchendaele also in October. In early 1918, the collapse of the Russian resistance on the Eastern Front enabled the Germans to transfer a large number of troops to the west, and the Germans subsequently launched their Spring Offensive. The offensive was initially successful in pushing the Allies back towards Amiens and the 10th Brigade's battalions, which had remained around Armentières throughout the winter, were hastily committed to a defensive role. In late March, the brigade fought a defensive actions around Dernancourt and Morlancourt. On 13 July, the brigade captured Merris.

The offensive was eventually halted and afterwards, in August, the Allies launched their Hundred Days offensive. The brigade was subsequently committed to the Allied advance through the Somme Valley, taking part in actions at Proyart, Bray and Clery. Shortly before the end of the war, due to heavy casualties amongst the AIF in 1918, the brigade's establishment was reduced to three infantry battalions as one—the 37th—was disbanded in September in order to reinforce the other battalions. This was due to widespread manpower shortages in the AIF as a result of the high number of casualties suffered during the Hundred Days Offensive.

=== Inter-war years and Second World War ===
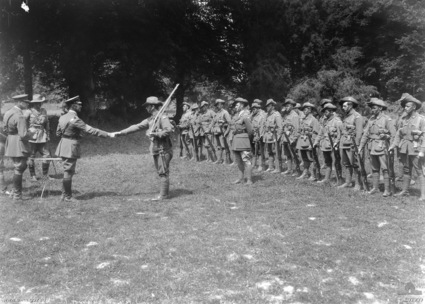
Members of the 10th Brigade receiving medals on parade, 7 July 1918

Following the end of the war, the 10th Brigade was disbanded; however, in 1921 it was re-raised as part of the Militia after it was decided to perpetuate the designations and battle honours of the AIF by reorganising Australia's part-time military force. Assigned to the 3rd Division again, at this time, the brigade was based in Melbourne and regional Victoria within the 3rd Military District and consisted of four infantry battalions: the 24th, 37th, 39th and 48th. The 48th Battalion was subsequently re-designated as the 52nd Battalion, and a new 48th Battalion re-raised in South Australia. On 1 May 1926, Thomas Blamey became commander of the brigade, remaining in the position until he took over the 3rd Division on 23 March 1931.

Upon the outbreak of the Second World War, the brigade was based in Victoria in September 1939, and assigned to the 3rd Division. On 8 December 1941, the brigade was mobilised for full-time duty as the Militia was called up for garrison and defensive duties following Japan's entry into the war. Forming part of the Army's reserve element, it was based at Nagambie Road, near Seymour, Victoria. As part of the mobilisation process, the brigade was reorganised into a brigade-group formation with organic artillery, anti-tank and engineer support. Its establishment was also reduced from four infantry battalions to three as the Australian Army moved towards the British Army brigade structure. In March 1942, the brigade moved to Bonegilla, Victoria, for further training before moving to Queensland to defend the area around Beaudesert. In July, the brigade moved again, this time to Oakhurst, as the 3rd Division began to move to Maryborough, where it would concentrate as part of II Corps. In September 1942, the 10th Brigade was disbanded—having not seen active service—as part of the reallocation of manpower resources that occurred within the Australian Army at that time.

During the war, the 10th Brigade's subordinate units included: the 37th, 52nd, 24th/39th and 24th Battalions, as well as the 2nd Field Regiment, Royal Australian Artillery, the 10th Field Company, Royal Australian Engineers and the 23rd Anti-Tank Battery, Royal Australian Artillery.

=== Modern era ===
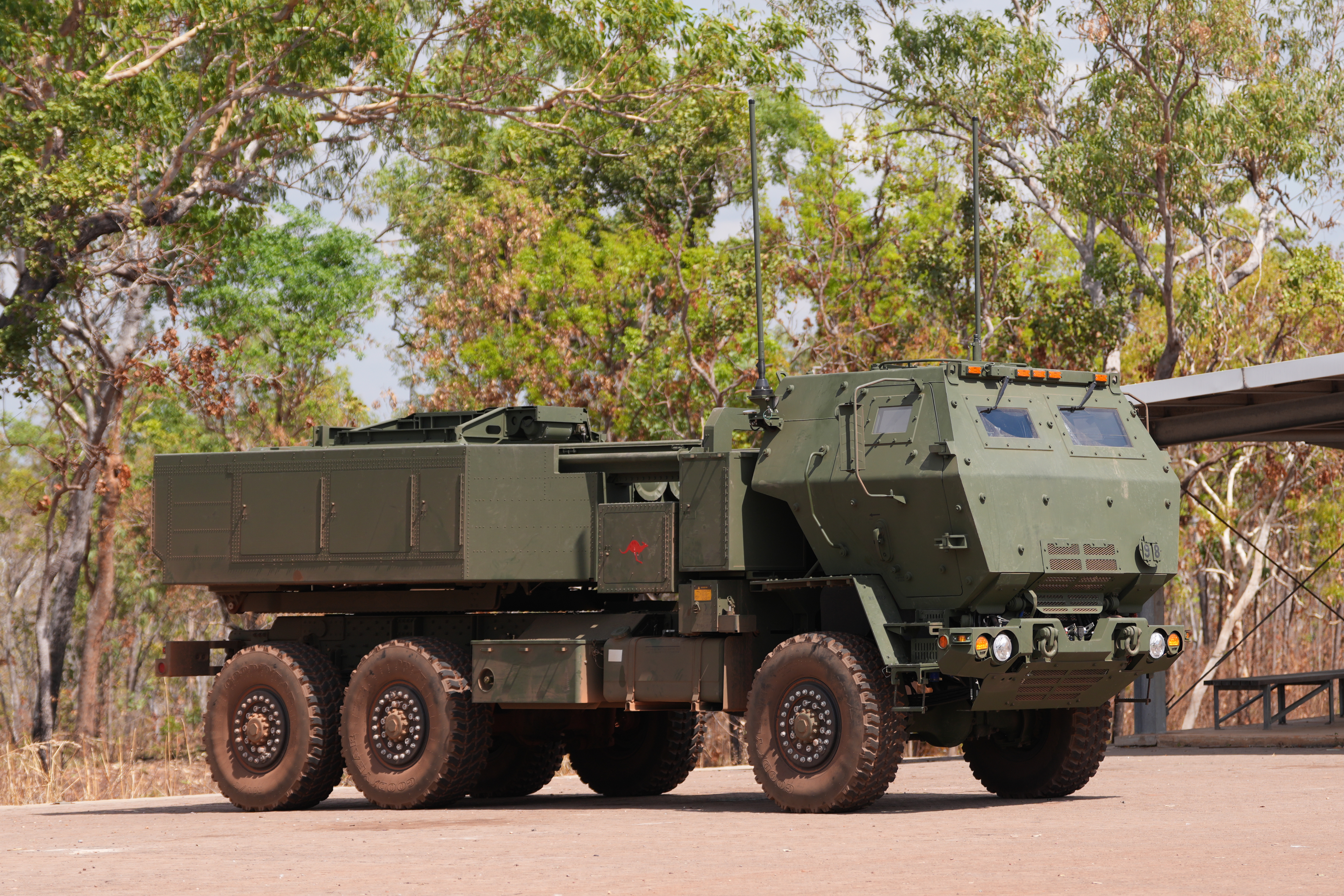
An Australian Army HIMARS in 2025

It was announced in 2023 by the Minister for Defence, Richard Marles, that the 10th Brigade was slated to be re-raised in Adelaide from 2025 and be responsible for the army's long-range strike and missile defence capabilities. The new structure would encompass units equipped with the High Mobility Artillery Rocket System (HIMARS) and the National Advanced Surface-to-Air Missile System (NASAMS).

The 16th Regiment, Royal Australian Artillery was transferred to the 10th Brigade in December 2024 when the 6th Brigade was disbanded. Two other former 6th Brigade units, the 1st Intelligence Battalion and 7th Signal Regiment, were assigned to the direct command of the 1st Division as a temporary measure ahead of being transferred to the 10th Brigade in late 2025.

In January 2024, the 10th Brigade was formally re-raised. In April 2025, 10th Brigade comprised the 9th Regiment, Royal Australian Artillery, the 16th Regiment, Royal Australian Artillery, the 54th Siege Battery which will be assigned to the 14th Regiment, Royal Australian Artillery when it is raised at Puckapunyal, and the theatre civil-military cooperation capability. The 14th Regiment, Royal Australian Artillery was planned to be formally raised in January 2026.

== See also ==
- List of Australian Army brigades
