= 50th Battalion (Australia) =

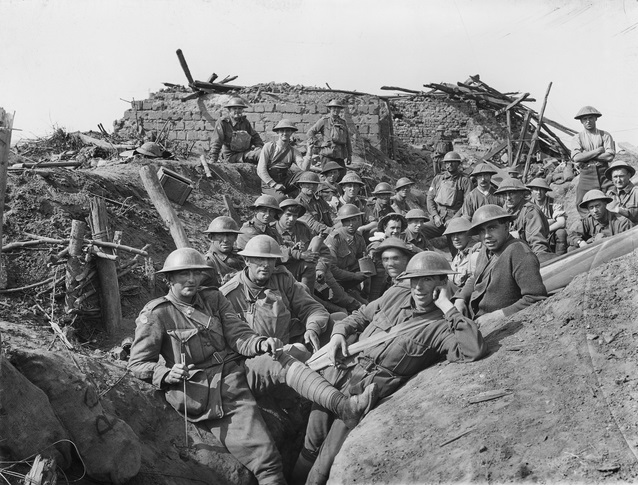
- Members of the 50th Battalion at Zonnebeke, September 1917
- Active: 1916–1919; 1921–1930; 1930–1936 (10th/50th Battalion); 1936–1945 (12th/50th Battalion)
- Country: Australia
- Branch: Army
- Type: Infantry
- Size: ~1,000 officers and men
- Part of: 13th Brigade; 4th Division
- Engagements: World War I: Western Front; World War II

Insignia
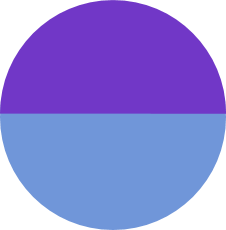
- Unit colour patch

The 50th Battalion was an infantry battalion of the Australian Army. It was originally raised in Egypt in early 1916 for service during World War I, drawing a cadre of experienced personnel from the 10th Battalion. After the unit's formation, it was transferred to Europe where it took part in the fighting in the trenches of the Western Front in France and Belgium. Following the end of hostilities, the battalion was amalgamated with the 51st Battalion in early 1919 as demobilisation reduced the numbers in both battalions. In the inter war period, the battalion was briefly reformed in 1921 as a part-time unit based initially in South Australia and then later in Tasmania. At different periods it was amalgamated with both the 10th and 12th Battalions. The battalion did not see combat during World War II, being employed as garrison troops in Australia instead, and it was disbanded in mid-1945.

== History ==
=== World War I ===
The 50th Battalion was originally raised in Egypt on 26 February 1916, as part of the reorganisation and expansion of the AIF following the Gallipoli campaign and prior to the transfer of the Australian infantry formations to the Western Front in Europe. This expansion was achieved by transferring cadres of experienced personnel predominately from the 1st Division to the newly formed battalions and combining them with recently recruited personnel who had been dispatched as reinforcements from Australia. With an authorised strength of just over 1,000, the unit's first intake of personnel were drawn from men originating from South Australia, many of whom had already served with the 10th Battalion. Under the command of Lieutenant Colonel Frederick Hurcombe, the battalion became part of the 13th Brigade attached to the 4th Australian Division.

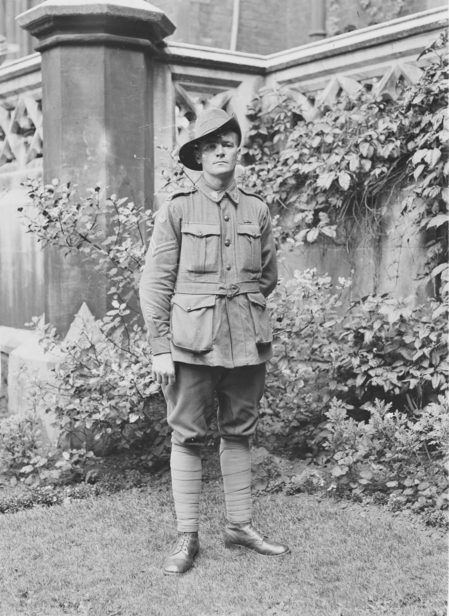
Private Jørgen Jensen, the 50th Battalion's sole Victoria Cross recipient

After arriving in France on 11 June 1916, the battalion was committed to the fighting, moving up to front on 28 June. Its first major action came during the Battle of Mouquet Farm during August and September, during which the 50th suffered over 400 casualties. Following this, it saw service attacking the Hindenburg Line in 1917. During actions at Noreuil on 2 April of that year, Private Jørgen Jensen performed the deeds that led to him being awarded the Victoria Cross (VC). Later in the year the 50th Battalion participated in the battles at Messines and Polygon Wood. At Messines, the 50th were initially used to provide carrying parties for the assault, before launching an attack around Blauwepoortbeek late on 9 June. Lacking artillery support, the attack was held up when it came up against uncut wire entanglements and machine guns. A scheduled relief was cancelled and second effort was made the following morning, this time with artillery support, and this succeeded in gaining part of the Oosttaverne Line. The Australians were relieved on 11 June, but before this took place a patrol from the 50th helped soldiers from the British 11th Division occupy Delporte Farm. In late September, during the fighting around Polygon Wood, the battalion took part in the 13th Brigade's attack against the Tokio Spur. Advancing towards Molenaarelsthoek, the attack proved successful and subsequently held the line against a German counterattack that was broken up by defensive artillery and machine guns. The battalion's losses around Polygon Wood amounted to 221 killed or wounded.

In early 1918, it undertook a defensive role south of the Ancre, helping to repulse the German spring offensive, a major German offensive that was launched on the Western Front following the collapse of Russia. In early April, the battalion took part in the Second Battle of Dernancourt. Later that month, on the morning of 24/25 April 1918—Anzac Day—the battalion took part in an Allied counter-attack at Villers-Bretonneux, in France. In August, the 50th joined the final Allied offensive of the war around Amiens, and continued fighting until 18 September when it fought its last battle of the war against the Hindenburg "Outpost Line", forming the divisional reserve. After the cessation of hostilities, the 50th Battalion was amalgamated with the 51st Battalion on 6 March 1919; together they were later also amalgamated with the 49th Battalion.

During the fighting, the battalion lost 720 men killed in action or died on active service and 1,557 wounded. Members of the battalion received the following decorations: one VC, one Distinguished Service Order (DSO) with one Bar, one Officer of the Order of the British Empire (OBE), 16 Military Crosses (MCs) with two Bars, 16 Distinguished Conduct Medals (DCMs), 122 Military Medals (MMs) with five Bars, eight Meritorious Service Medals (MSMs), 25 Mentions in Despatches (MIDs) and eight foreign awards.

=== Inter-war years and World War II ===
In 1921, the battalion was re-raised as part the re-organisation of the Australian military that took place at that time. Assigned to the 4th Military District, the battalion was raised as a part-time unit in South Australia, drawing personnel from the Citizen Forces' 50th Infantry Regiment. In 1927, the battalion adopted the territorial designation of the "Barrier Regiment". In 1930, amidst the austerity of the Great Depression and following the election of the Scullin Labor government and the subsequent suspension of the compulsory training scheme, the decision was made to amalgamate the battalion due to a decline in the numbers of volunteers. At this time it was merged with the 10th Battalion, with whom they had a shared history, to become the "10th/50th Battalion" assigned to the 3rd Brigade.

These battalions remained linked until 1936 when, in response to fears of a possible war in Europe following the reoccupation of the Rhineland, it was decided to expand the size of the Militia. As a result, on 1 October 1936 the 10th/50th Battalion was split. It was later transferred to the 6th Military District in Tasmania. It was then amalgamated with the 12th Battalion as the "12th/50th Battalion (The Launceston Regiment/The Tasmanian Rangers)" in December 1936. In 1939, the motto Quo fas et gloria ducunt was approved for the 12th/50th Battalion.

During World War II, the two battalions remained linked, undertaking garrison duties in Australia. The 12th/50th Battalion served as part of York Force and manned defences in the Northern Territory. On 2 May 1945, the 12th/50th Battalion was amalgamated with the 40th Battalion and became the 12th/40th Battalion with the 50th Battalion being disbanded. In 1966, following the reintroduction of national service, the Army authorised the re-raising of the 50th Battalion as part of the Royal Tasmania Regiment (50 RTR), as a remote area battalion within the Citizens Military Force, offering special conditions of service for national servicemen who could not meet their training requirements through normal attendance due to their occupation or place of residence. Ultimately, only a small number of special conditions soldiers were enlisted, and as a result 50 RTR was not re-raised, with the Tasmanian personnel instead being allocated to the 22nd Battalion, Royal Victoria Regiment, which had also been raised as a remote area battalion.

== Battle honours ==
- World War I: Somme 1916, Somme 1918, Pozières, Bullecourt, Messines 1917, Ypres 1917, Menin Road, Polygon Wood, Passchendaele, Ancre 1918, Villers-Bretonneux, Hamel, Amiens, Albert 1918, Hindenburg Line 1917, Hindenburg Line 1918, Epehy, France and Flanders 1916–1918, Egypt 1915–1917.
