= 7th Field Regiment, Royal Australian Artillery =

- Active: 1948 – 2013
- Country: Australia
- Branch: Army
- Type: Artillery
- Role: Field artillery
- Size: Two batteries
- Part of: 8th Brigade
- Garrison/HQ: Pymble, New South Wales

Insignia
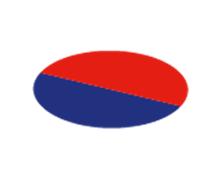
- Unit colour patch

The 7th Field Regiment, Royal Australian Artillery was an Australian Army Reserve artillery unit with its headquarters at Pymble, New South Wales, and was part of 8th Brigade until it was disbanded in early 2013.

== History ==
The regiment traced its lineage to the 7th Field Artillery Brigade that was formed as part of the 3rd Division in March 1916, which served on the Western Front during World War I. This unit was re-formed during the inter-war years as a part-time unit in New South Wales. In 1938 the unit was redesignated as the 7th Field Regiment RAA (Militia) and throughout the war undertook garrison duties in New South Wales and Western Australia. Although it was later gazetted as an AIF unit after the majority of its personnel volunteered for overseas service, the regiment was deemed surplus to requirements and disbanded in October 1943 and its personnel used to reinforce other units.

During the post war period, the regiment was re-raised when the Citizens Military Force was established in 1948. Personnel were received from the disbanded 21st Field Regiment in 1957, and in 1960 the regiment also gained personnel from the 14th Field Regiment. In 1965, 26 Field Battery's 25-pounders were replaced with L5 howitzers but these were withdrawn in 1967, the battery reverting to 25-pounders. The regiment reorganised several times, with various component batteries existing at various times: R, P and Q batteries existed during the 1950s and early 1960s before being reorganised. Later the regiment contained 5, 26, 27, 28, and 113 Batteries. In 1996, the regiment's headquarters moved to Suakin Street, Pymble, following the closure of the Warrane Road, Willoughby, depot on 16 March of that year.

Following changes brought about by Plan BEERSHEEBA, the regiment was disbanded on 1 January 2013 and replaced by a battery sized establishment known as 7 Light Battery ,9th Regiment, Royal Australian Artillery. It is equipped with 81mm mortars. The former gun batteries were reduced to troop size and remain at the same depots.

== Structure ==
Just prior to its disbandment, the regiment had two gun batteries which were equipped with the L119 Hamel Gun:

- 28 Field Battery based at Dee Why.
- 113 Field Battery based at Adamstown with a Troop at Erina.
