= Miraumont =

- Commune
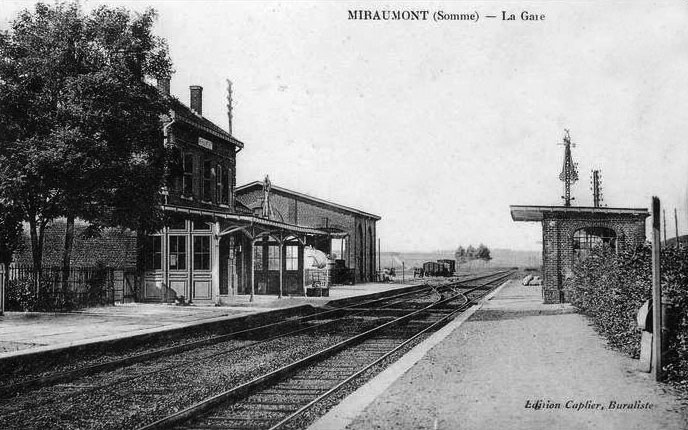
- Miraumont railway station in the early 20th century
- Location of Miraumont
- Location within France Location within Hauts-de-France
- Coordinates: 50°05′42″N 2°43′50″E
- Country: France
- Region: Hauts-de-France
- Department: Somme
- Arrondissement: Péronne
- Canton: Albert
- Intercommunality: Pays du Coquelicot

Government
  - Mayor (2020–2026): René Delattre
- Area^{1}: 13.96 km^{2} (5.39 sq mi)
- Elevation: 89 m (292 ft)
- Highest elevation: 142 m (466 ft)
- Lowest elevation: 77 m (253 ft)
- Population (2023): 620
  - Density: 44/km^{2} (120/sq mi)
- Time zone: UTC+01:00 (CET)
  - Summer (DST): UTC+02:00 (CEST)
- INSEE/Postal code: 80549 /80300
- ^{1} French Land Register data, which excludes lakes, ponds, glaciers > 1 km^{2} (0.386 sq mi or 247 acres) and river estuaries.

Miraumont (French pronunciation: [miʁomɔ̃]) is a commune in the Somme department in Hauts-de-France in northern France.

Current agricultural products include grains, potatoes, and beets.

== Geography ==
Miraumont is situated on the D107 and D50 crossroads, some 27 miles (43 km) northeast of Amiens, Miraumont is located at the source of the river Ancre, the third longest tributary of the Somme.

The railway station at Miraumont is between the station at Achiet, near Bapaume, and the station at Albert, the administrative center of the canton.

== History ==
The theatre of operations for the Battle of Bapaume (1871) during the Franco-Prussian War of 1870–1871.

The village was almost completely destroyed between 1914 and 1918 during the First World War.

== Population ==
Historical population
Year	Pop.	±% p.a.
1968	680	—
1975	671	−0.19%
1982	695	+0.50%
1990	632	−1.18%
1999	655	+0.40%
2007	705	+0.92%
2012	685	−0.57%
2017	664	−0.62%
2023	620	−1.14%
Source: INSEE

== See also ==
- Communes of the Somme department
