= Noreuil =

- Commune
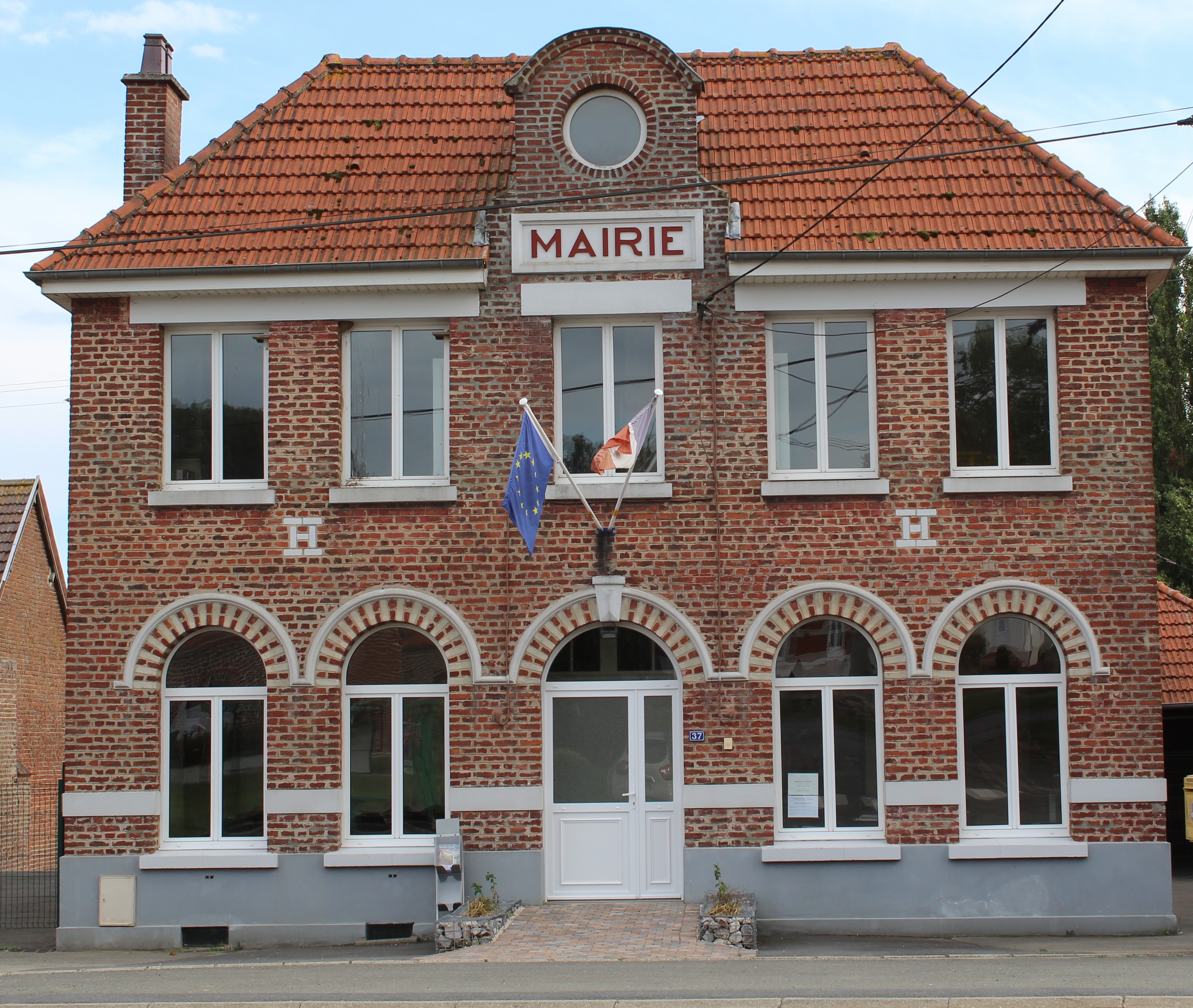
- The town hall of Noreuil
- Location of Noreuil
- Location within France Location within Hauts-de-France
- Coordinates: 50°10′17″N 2°56′07″E
- Country: France
- Region: Hauts-de-France
- Department: Pas-de-Calais
- Arrondissement: Arras
- Canton: Bapaume
- Intercommunality: CC Sud-Artois

Government
  - Mayor (2020–2026): Sylvie Manechez
- Area^{1}: 4.79 km^{2} (1.85 sq mi)
- Elevation: 80 m (260 ft)
- Highest elevation: 110 m (360 ft)
- Lowest elevation: 72 m (236 ft)
- Population (2023): 130
  - Density: 27/km^{2} (70/sq mi)
- Time zone: UTC+01:00 (CET)
  - Summer (DST): UTC+02:00 (CEST)
- INSEE/Postal code: 62619 /62128
- ^{1} French Land Register data, which excludes lakes, ponds, glaciers > 1 km^{2} (0.386 sq mi or 247 acres) and river estuaries.

Noreuil (French pronunciation: [nɔʁœj]) is a commune in the Pas-de-Calais department in the Hauts-de-France region of France 13 miles (21 km) southeast of Arras.

== Population ==
Historical population
Year	Pop.	±% p.a.
1968	143	—
1975	128	−1.57%
1982	135	+0.76%
1990	117	−1.77%
1999	114	−0.29%
2007	130	+1.66%
2012	141	+1.64%
2017	160	+2.56%
2023	130	−3.40%
Source: INSEE

== See also ==
- Communes of the Pas-de-Calais department
