= 9th Regiment, Royal Australian Artillery =

Australian Army artillery unit

- Active: 1903–present
- Country: Australia
- Branch: Army
- Type: Artillery
- Role: Surveillance and target acquisition
- Size: 6 artillery batteries
- Part of: 10th Brigade
- Garrison/HQ: Sydney
- Mottos: Ubique (also battle honour), Quo Fas et Gloria Ducunt
- Colours: Blue and red
- March: Quick – Royal Artillery Quick March; Slow – Royal Artillery Slow March
- Anniversaries: 1 July

Insignia
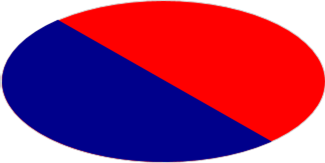
- Unit colour patch 2018–present
- Abbreviation: 9 Regt

The 9th Regiment, Royal Australian Artillery is an artillery regiment of the Australian Army. It draws lineage from an artillery unit raised in 1903, which provided personnel to artillery units raised for service during World War I seeing action on the Western Front. It was mobilised for service during World War II and undertook defensive duties in Australia before being disbanded in 1944. The regiment was re-raised as part of the Australian Army Reserve in 2018, and currently provides artillery support to the 2nd Division. It consists of six light batteries, which are based at numerous depots around the country. The regiment's headquarters is based in Sydney, New South Wales.

== History ==
=== First World War ===
The regiment draws its lineage from the 4th Artillery Brigade that was formed on 1 July 1903 at Victoria Barracks in Sydney. During the First World War, a large number of the unit's personnel volunteered with the all volunteer Australian Imperial Force and in 1914 a large cadre of trained personnel were provided to the 1st Field Artillery Brigade, which was assigned to the 1st Division. This unit went on to serve at Gallipoli and on the Western Front. The 9th Field Artillery Brigade, consisting of the 33rd, 34th and 35th Field Batteries, and the 118th Field Howitzer Battery, was also raised in 1916 for service on the Western Front, as part of the 3rd Division. The current regiment claims lineage with this unit. The 3rd Division undertook training in the United Kingdom in mid- to late-1916, before deploying to the Western Front in December 1916; as a result, it missed the fighting on the Somme. Shortly after the division's arrival, the 9th Field Artillery Brigade was disbanded in mid-January 1917 when the decision was made to consolidate the number of guns within each battery and reduce the number of artillery brigades in each division.

=== Second World War ===
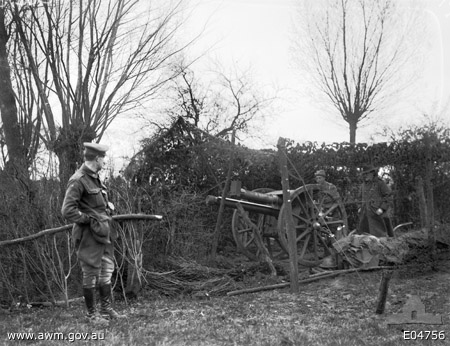
A camouflaged gun position of the 1st Australian Field Artillery Brigade; during World War I

In 1921, after the AIF was demobilised, Australia's part-time military forces were reorganised. At this time, the 9th Field Brigade was raised at Paddington, assigned to the 2nd Division, and served throughout the interwar years as part of the Militia.

During the Second World War, the 2/9th Field Regiment was raised as part of the all-volunteer Second Australian Imperial Force. This unit undertook active service in the Middle East and undertook garrison duties in Australia. Meanwhile, the separate 9th Field Brigade was reorganised as the 9th Field Regiment in February 1941, initially consisting of the 19th and 20th Batteries. It was mobilised for defensive duties in December 1941 after Japan's entry into the war. Around this time, the regiment was assigned to the 1st Division. Initially, the two batteries were deployed to support the 28th Brigade around Wollongong and the 9th Brigade defending the northern beaches around Sydney. A third battery – the 21st – was raised in January 1942, and after the regiment was relieved of its defensive positions, it concentrated at Wallgrove and undertook training under the command of the 2nd Division.

After this, the regiment was returned to the 1st Division, and the defensive plan changed, resulting in the regimental headquarters moved to St Ives, and the batteries deployed to support the 9th Brigade. The regiment was moved several times during the final months of 1942, firstly to Pymble and then Largs, and early the following year the 19th Battery supported amphibious warfare training at Port Stephens. A number of personnel were transferred at this time to the 1st Field Regiment and the 2nd Mountain Battery for service in New Guinea. Meanwhile, the regiment continued home service, providing training to underage soldiers before they were posted to operational units. The 20th Battery was detached and converted into a depot battery for the School of Artillery at Holsworthy, and in December 1943 the regiment moved to Dapto. They remained there until May 1944 when they moved to Narellan. The regiment was disbanded there in April 1944, while the 20th Battery was disbanded at Holsworthy after being relieved by the 53rd Battery.

=== 21st Century ===
The regiment was re-raised on 15 January 2018 to provide a regimental headquarters for all Australian Army Reserve mortar-equipped light batteries assigned to the 2nd Division. To mark the event, a formal ceremony was held at Victoria Barracks in Sydney on 14 April 2018. The same month, Bayside Council announced that they would grant the regiment Freedom of Entry to the city in 2019. Headquartered at Sydney, the regiment currently commands six light batteries: the 2nd/10th, 3rd, 5th/11th, 6th/13th, 7th, and 23rd, which are based at various depots around the country where they support local 2nd Division units.

In 2023 it was reported that the 9th Regiment was in the process of changing its focus to the surveillance and target acquisition role. This included operating small uncrewed aerial systems and radars. The regiment was transferred to the 10th Brigade in early 2025, upon the re-establishment of the brigade as the Army's long range fires unit.

== Structure ==
- 2nd/10th Battery - Victoria and Tasmania
- 3rd Battery - Western Australia
- 5th/11th Battery - Queensland
- 6th/13th Battery - South Australia
- 7th Battery - New South Wales
- 23rd Battery - Australian Capital Territory

== See also ==
- Royal Australian Artillery
