= 2nd/10th Field Regiment, Royal Australian Artillery =

Australian Army artillery unit

- Active: 1991–2012
- Country: Australia
- Branch: Army
- Type: Artillery
- Role: Field artillery
- Size: 2 batteries
- Part of: 2nd Division
- Garrison/HQ: Victoria
- Motto: Brilliant at the basics
- Colors: Blue and red

Commanders
- Captain General of the RAA: Elizabeth II

The 2nd/10th Field Regiment, Royal Australian Artillery was an Australian Army Reserve artillery regiment, assigned to the 2nd Division. Formed in 1991, and based in Victoria, the regiment drew on the lineage of a number of disbanded units that had previously existed in the state. In 2013, the regiment was reduced to a single battery, designated the 2nd/10th Light Battery. It was assigned to the 5th/6th Battalion, Royal Victoria Regiment, and tasked with training artillery observers and organic fire support to the battalion. It was equipped with the L16 81mm Mortar as the primary armament, while M2A2 Howitzers were retained for ceremonial purposes.

In 2018, the battery became part of the newly raised 9th Regiment, Royal Australian Artillery which was formed as the headquarters unit for a number of Army Reserve light batteries.

== History ==
2nd Field Regiment – Arguably until 2013 the oldest artillery unit in Australia, being directly descended from the Royal Victoria Volunteer Artillery Regiment which was formed in the Melbourne metropolitan area on 1 January 1856 by redesignation of the Victoria Volunteer Rifle Regiment, raised on 30 November 1854. It became the Victorian Brigade, Australian Field Artillery, in 1903 and in 1921 formed II. Brigade, Australian Field Artillery, later the 2nd Field Artillery Brigade, perpetuating the unit of the same name that had served at Gallipoli and on the Western Front during the Great War. It became 2nd Field Regiment in early 1942, deploying operationally in New Guinea and Bougainville during 1943–1945, and disbanding in 1946. In 1948, the regiment was raised again as part of the CMF in the 3rd Division in Victoria. In 1952, the regiment was at full strength and located at Batman Avenue with S Battery at Warragul. This latter battery later transferred to 31st Medium Regiment RAA. The regiment was amalgamated with 15th Field Regiment in 1975 to become 2nd/15th Field Regiment with elements at Batman Avenue, Frankston and Dandenong. In 1988, the 3rd Division Royal Australian Artillery Band was incorporated into 2nd/15th Field Regiment.

4th Medium Regiment – 2nd Medium Artillery Brigade, Australian Garrison Artillery, was raised at the Argyle St drill hall, St Kilda, in 1925, recruiting from Brighton and Melbourne's eastern suburbs. It was reorganized as 2nd Medium Regiment in 1941, serving in Western Australia and Queensland; one battery and part of Regimental Headquarters were deployed to Balikpapan in 1945 but arrived as the war ended in the Pacific and did not see action. It was reformed as 2nd Medium Regiment RAA at Chapel Street East St Kilda in 1948 and in 1955 was relocated to Brighton and renumbered 4th Medium Regiment RAA to perpetuate the pre-war 4th Field Regiment RAA(M) which had shared its recruiting area. In 1957 the regiment was disbanded, its personnel and those of the 22nd Field Regiment (Self-Propelled) RAA joining to form a battery of 10th Medium Regiment RAA at Brighton.

8th Medium Regiment – descends from the oldest Victorian volunteer unit, first raised in September 1854 in Geelong as a Volunteer Rifle Corps and converted to artillery as the 2nd Brigade, Royal Victoria Volunteer Artillery Regiment in 1862. It formed two companies of the Australian Garrison Artillery in 1903 but these were relocated to Williamstown between 1925 and 1929. In 1938 the unit was reformed at Geelong as 4th Anti-Aircraft Battery RAA(M). In 1948 this unit was perpetuated as Regimental Headquarters and P Battery, 2nd Light Anti-Aircraft Regiment RAA, being converted to 2nd Heavy Anti-Aircraft Regiment RAA in 1951 and having the title (City of Geelong) conferred in 1953. In 1955 it was renumbered 8th Heavy Anti-Aircraft Regiment RAA (City of Geelong Regiment). In 1957 the Regiment absorbed elements of 38th Light Anti-Aircraft Regiment RAA (City of Hamilton Regiment) to form 8th Medium Regiment with RHQ at Geelong and elements at Warrnambool and Colac. In 1960 the Regiment was absorbed into 10th Medium Regiment, forming P and R batteries of that regiment. 8th Medium Regiment was retained at nil strength on the Order of Battle for inclusion in the Combat Support Group, 3rd Division, and RHQ was reformed at Holsworthy, New South Wales, in 1969 as a sub-unit of the Australian Regular Army by redesignation of RHQ 19th Composite Regiment RAA. 8th Medium Regiment amalgamated with 12th Field Regiment in 1973 to form 8th/12th Medium Regiment RAA, currently 8th/12th Regiment RAA.

15th Field Regiment – raised as XV. Brigade, Australian Field Artillery, at Williamstown in 1921 from the 7th Australian Garrison Artillery which had its origins in the Williamstown and Harbour Trust batteries of garrison artillery raised in 1856 and 1885 respectively. It perpetuated the 15th Field Artillery Brigade which served on the Western Front during the Great War. In 1922 the greater part of the brigade was relocated to the Albert Rd depot at South Melbourne and the whole brigade was concentrated at Batman Ave, Melbourne, by late 1935. It was redesignated 15th Field Regiment RAA in 1941, serving in Western Australia under command of the 4th Aust Division until its disbandment in 1943. In 1952 15th Light Regiment RAA was raised at Sale from a squadron of 8th/13th Victorian Mounted Rifles, later expanding to Bairnsdale and Traralgon. In 1957 the Regiment was disbanded; elements at Sale, Bairnsdale and Traralgon were absorbed by 31st Medium Regiment which was redesignated 15th Field Regiment with Regimental Headquarters and one battery at Dandenong, and two batteries spread between Sale, Bairnsdale, Warragul and Traralgon. In 1962 the Regiment was granted the title (City of Dandenong and Gippsland) and by 1965 was located at Dandenong and Frankston. In 1975 it amalgamated with 2nd Field Regiment to form 2nd/15th Field Regiment.

10th Medium Regiment – raised as X. Brigade, Australian Field Artillery, in 1921 at Albert Rd, South Melbourne, perpetuating the 10th Field Artillery Brigade that had served on the Western Front during the Great War. It was redesignated 10th Field Regiment in 1941, serving in Western Australia with the 4th Aust Division before being disbanded in late 1943. In 1948 it was reformed at Batman Ave, Melbourne, relocating to Railway Parade, Frankston, about 1954. In 1957 the Regiment was redesignated 10th Medium Regiment with RHQ and one battery at Frankston, the 19th Light Anti-Aircraft Regiment (City of Caulfield) at Ripponlea was absorbed as a second battery, and the personnel of 4th Medium Regiment and 22nd Field Regiment (Self-Propelled) at Brighton formed the third battery. RHQ relocated to Brighton in 1958. In 1960 the Regiment absorbed 8th Medium Regiment to comprise RHQ at Brighton and batteries at Geelong, Frankston, and Warrnambool/Colac. In 1961 however, the Brighton and Frankston elements amalgamated as Q Battery, 2nd Field Regiment; RHQ and Q Battery, 10th Medium Regiment, were reformed in Geelong, with R Battery at Warrnambool. The Warrnambool element transferred to the Royal Australian Infantry in 1965 and the third battery was reformed in Geelong. In 1991 the Regiment amalgamated with 2nd/15th Field Regiment to form 2nd/10th Medium Regiment with 37th and 39th Medium batteries amalgamating to form 38th Medium Battery.

2nd/10th Medium Regiment – In 1990 the 3rd Division disbanded. 2nd Division inherited the amalgamated 2nd/15th Field Regiment and 10th Medium Regiment to form 2nd/10th Medium Regiment in 1991, with RHQ and HQ Battery at Chapel St, St Kilda, 22nd Field Battery at Dandenong and Baxter, and 38th Medium Battery at Geelong and Colac. The RAA Band Melbourne was carried on the establishment of 2nd/10th Medium Regiment.

2nd/10th Field Regiment – In 2002 the Regiment was renamed as 2nd/10th Field Regiment. Equipped with M2A2s, the Regiment consisted of 22nd Field Battery located at Doveton and 38th Field Battery located at Geelong and Colac. Regimental Headquarters, Headquarters Battery and the Regimental Band were located at Chapel Street, St Kilda.

2nd/10th Light Battery, 5th/6th Battalion, Royal Victoria Regiment – On 1 January 2013, the Regiment was absorbed by the 5th/6th Battalion, Royal Victoria Regiment as the 2nd/10th Light Battery. 38th Field Battery became 38 Troop at Chapel Street, which trained the battalion's artillery observers, while 22nd Field Battery became 22 Troop in Doveton, which trained mortar crews and command post operators.
