= Dernancourt =

- Commune
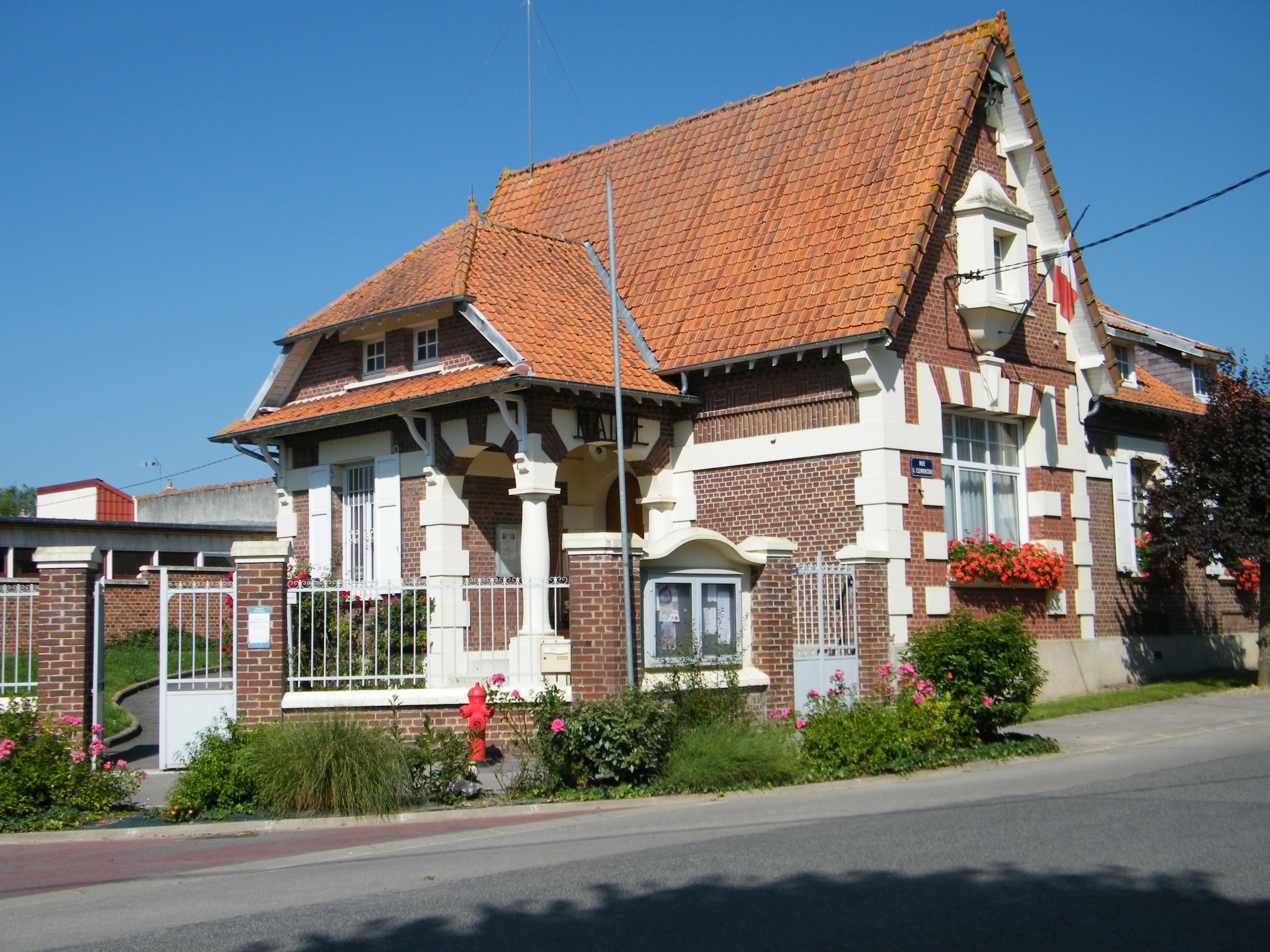
- Dernancourt Town Hall, 2014

- Coat of arms
- Location of Dernancourt
- Location within France Location within Hauts-de-France
- Coordinates: 49°58′29″N 2°37′54″E
- Country: France
- Region: Hauts-de-France
- Department: Somme
- Arrondissement: Péronne
- Canton: Albert
- Intercommunality: Pays du Coquelicot

Government
  - Mayor (2020–2026): Sylvain Lequeux
- Area^{1}: 6.63 km^{2} (2.56 sq mi)
- Elevation: 46 m (151 ft)
- Highest elevation: 107 m (351 ft)
- Lowest elevation: 39 m (128 ft)
- Population (2023): 517
  - Density: 78.0/km^{2} (202/sq mi)
- Time zone: UTC+01:00 (CET)
  - Summer (DST): UTC+02:00 (CEST)
- INSEE/Postal code: 80238 /80300
- ^{1} French Land Register data, which excludes lakes, ponds, glaciers > 1 km^{2} (0.386 sq mi or 247 acres) and river estuaries.

Dernancourt (French pronunciation: [dɛʁnɑ̃kuʁ]; Picard: Dèrnincourt) is a commune in the Somme department in Hauts-de-France in northern France.

== Geography ==
Dernancourt is situated on the D52 road, some 30 km (19 mi) northeast of Amiens.

== Population ==
Historical population
Year	Pop.	±% p.a.
1968	345	—
1975	401	+2.17%
1982	501	+3.23%
1990	472	−0.74%
1999	437	−0.85%
2007	442	+0.14%
2012	440	−0.09%
2017	540	+4.18%
2023	517	−0.72%
Source: INSEE

== Places and monuments ==
The commune was considerably affected by World War I. The First and Second Battles of Dernancourt were fought there. 127 Commonwealth soldiers are buried in the Dernancourt Communal Cemetery and 2167 are buried in the Dernancourt Communal Cemetery Extension.

== Heraldry ==
Coat of arms of Dernancourt	Divided wavy: in the 1st part, I or a steam locomotive on its bored rails, all sable, in the 2nd gules a kangaroo and its young in its pouch or, in the 2nd vert seven ears of wheat grasped in a fan or and tied gules; overall a wavy fess azure over the partition. Created by Jean-François Binon. Presented during the mayor's New Year's address on January 13, 2023.

== See also ==
- Communes of the Somme department
