= Ancre =

River of Picardy, France

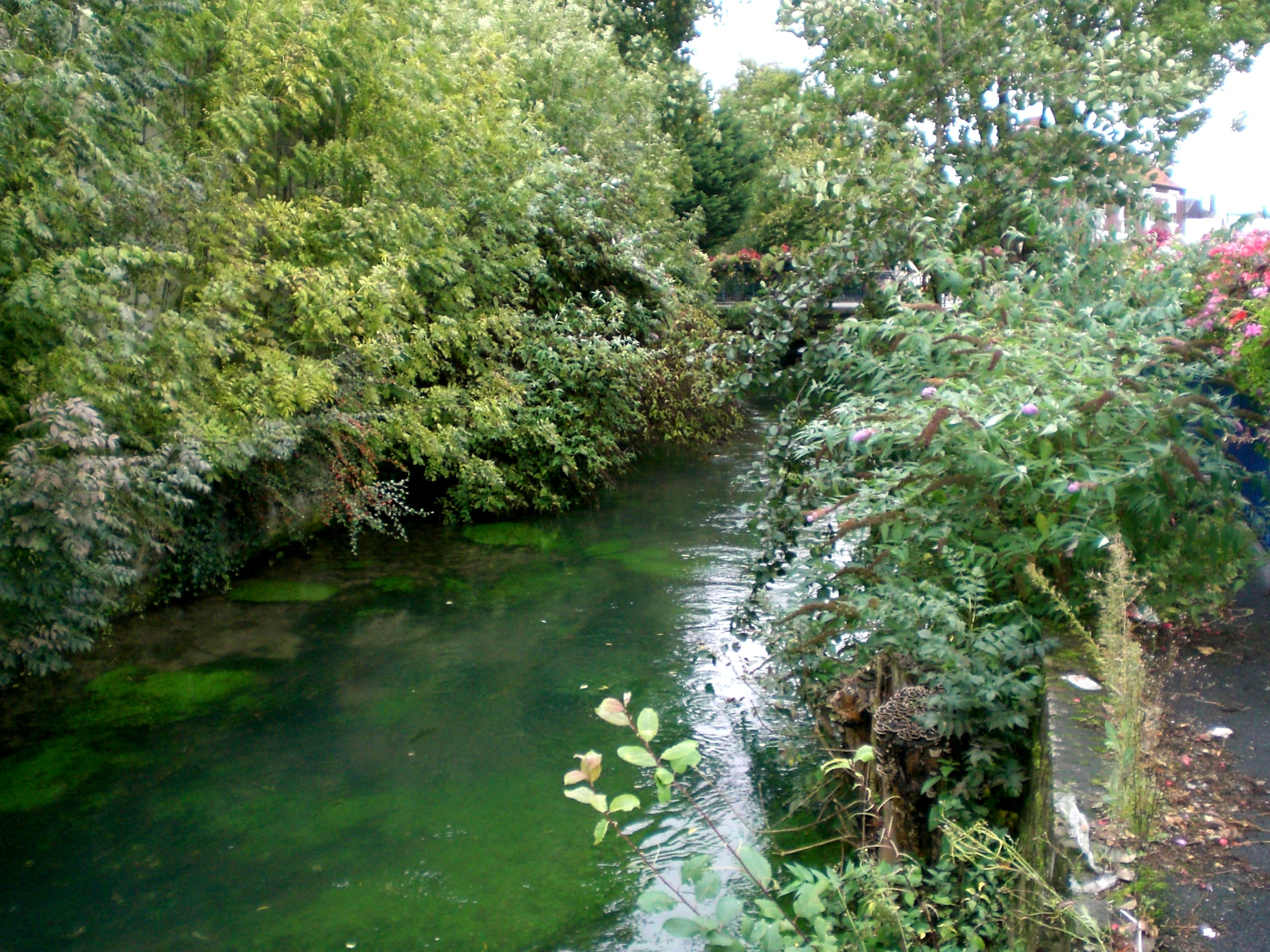

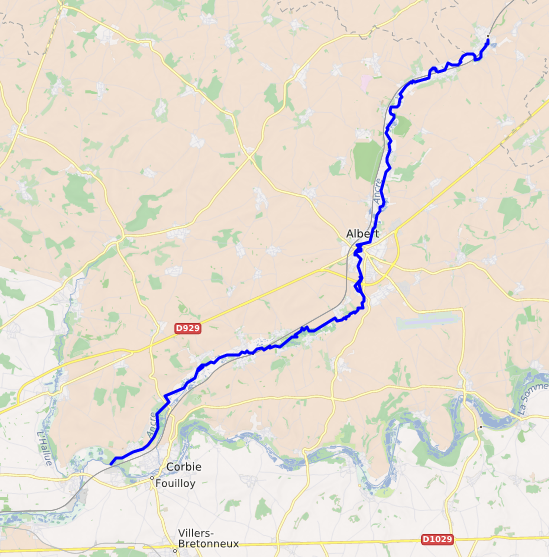
- Native name: Inke (Picard)

Location
- Country: France

Physical characteristics
- Source
  - location: Miraumont
- Mouth
  - location: Somme
  - coordinates: 49°54′24″N 2°28′33″E
- Length: 37 km (23 mi)
- Basin size: 327 km^{2} (126 sq mi)
- Discharge
  - average: 2.1 m^{3}/s (74 cu ft/s)

Basin features
- Progression: Somme→ English Channel

The Ancre (French pronunciation: [ɑ̃kʁ]; Picard: Inke) is a river of Picardy, France. Rising at Miraumont, a hamlet near the town of Albert, it flows into the Somme at Corbie. It is 37.4 km (23.2 mi) long. For most of its length it flows through the department of Somme. For a short stretch near Puisieux, it forms the border with Pas-de-Calais.

== See also ==
- Battle of the Ancre Heights (October 1916)
- Battle of the Ancre (November 1916)
