= 40th Battalion (Australia) =

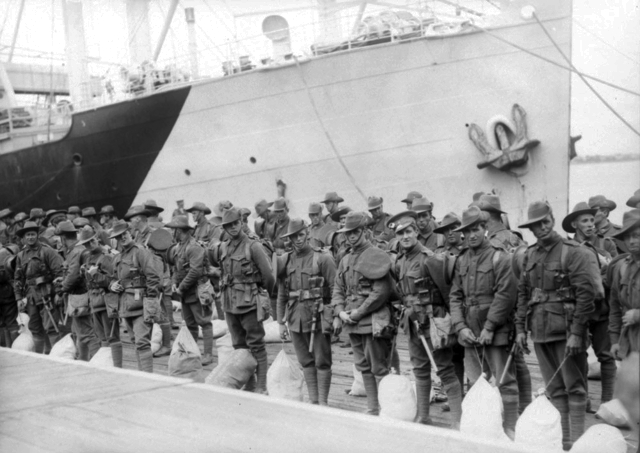
- Reinforcements for the 40th Battalion in Melbourne on their way to the Western Front, October 1917.
- Active: 1916–1919; 1921–1945; 1953–1960; 1972–1987
- Country: Australia
- Branch: Australian Army
- Type: Infantry
- Size: ~800–1,000 men
- Part of: 10th Brigade, 3rd Division (First World War); 12th Brigade
- Nickname: Derwent Regiment
- Motto: Pro Aris Et Focis
- Colours: White over red
- March: Invercargill
- Engagements: First World War: Western Front

Insignia
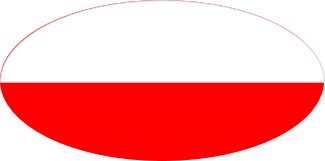
- Unit colour patch

The 40th Battalion was an infantry battalion of the Australian Army. Raised in 1916 as part of the Australian Imperial Force during the First World War, the battalion was recruited completely from Tasmania as part of the 10th Brigade, 3rd Division. During the war the battalion served in the trenches along the Western Front and had the distinction of having two of its members awarded the Victoria Cross. The battalion was disbanded in 1919, however was re-raised in 1921 as part of the Citizens Force, serving as a part-time unit in Tasmania throughout the inter-war years. During the Second World War, the 40th remained in Australia until it was amalgamated with the 12th Battalion. It was disbanded in 1946, but was later re-raised in the 1950s before being subsumed into the Royal Tasmania Regiment in 1960. In 1987, it was merged into the 12th/40th Battalion, Royal Tasmania Regiment.

== History ==
=== First World War ===
The 40th Battalion was formed in Tasmania in early 1916 as part of an expansion of the Australian Imperial Force (AIF) that took place after the Gallipoli Campaign. Under the command of Lieutenant Colonel John Lord, the battalion was assigned to the 10th Brigade along with the 37th, 38th and 39th Battalions, and formed part of the 3rd Division, which was formed in Australia before being dispatched to Europe to join the other four divisions that had been transferred from Egypt. Initially it had been planned to only raise two companies in Tasmania, and two in Victoria, but it was later determined that all four companies would be provided by Tasmania due to the public relations value it would have. After a period of training at Claremont, Tasmania, the battalion embarked aboard HMAT Berrima on 1 July 1916 from Hobart, arriving in England on 22 August, where it encamped at Lark Hill for training. Upon arrival on Salisbury Plain, about 200 men were transferred from the 40th Battalion as reinforcements for Australian units that were already in France; these losses were subsequently made up by a batch of reinforcements from South Australia. A period of intense training followed as the battalion was prepared for trench warfare on the Western Front. Finally, in November 1916 the 3rd Division, including the 40th Battalion, was transferred to France.

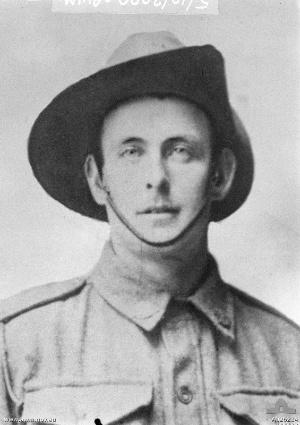
Lewis McGee, the 40th Battalion's first Victoria Cross recipient

With an authorised strength of 1,023 men, the 40th Battalion arrived at the front in December, but its first major battle did not come until June 1917 when it fought in the Battle of Messines. The introduction to war proved costly, with the battalion losing over 350 men killed or wounded. Its next major effort came four months later during the Battle of Broodseinde Ridge on 4 October, where one of the battalion's soldiers, Sergeant Lewis McGee of 'B' Company, performed the deeds for which he was awarded the Victoria Cross. As McGee's platoon advanced, it began taking heavy machine gun fire from a German pillbox. Alone, McGee ran over open ground and, with only his service revolver, he killed the machine-gun's crew and captured the remainder of the pillbox's garrison. Later, he returned to his platoon and gathered a group of men to take another machine gun post; the battalion was subsequently able to take its objective. A week later, the battalion took part in a follow-up attack as the Battle of Passchendaele continued. Advancing across muddy ground, the battalion came under machine gun fire from their front and flanks, and the attack ultimately failed due to the weather. Combined with their losses at Broodseinde Ridge, the 40th Battalion suffered 248 casualties during the fighting around Passchendaele, including McGee who was killed in action trying to silence a machine-gun post during the failed follow-up attack.

In early 1918, the Germans launched a major offensive on the Western Front after the collapse of Tsarist Russia allowed them to concentrate their forces in the west. In late March, as the Allies were pushed back towards the vital Amiens railhead and the situation became desperate, the 40th Battalion was hurried into a defensive position between the Ancre river and the Somme. The battalion subsequently fought during the Battle of the Somme, where they helped hold back the German offensive at Morlancourt. During a three-day battle, the battalion took heavy casualties, losing 225 men, but it struck a significant blow, advancing over 1,200 yards (1,100 m) and securing a vital position overlooking Amiens. A series of minor actions – dubbed "peaceful penetrations" – followed as the German advance was blunted. In August and September, after the Allies launched their own offensive, which ultimately ended the war, the battalion helped to drive the Germans back to the Hindenburg Line. Sergeant Percy Statton was awarded the Victoria Cross for actions near Proyart in mid-August, leading a small group of men forward to destroy four German positions that were holding up the Australians' advance, before carrying out two wounded men, while under fire.

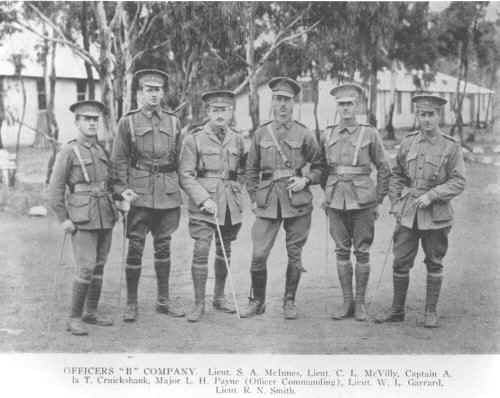
Officers of "B"Coy, 40th Battalion, 1916

The 40th Battalion's final action came on 29 September. The Australian Corps had suffered heavy casualties during 1918, which they had been unable to replace as enlistments had fallen, and it was subsequently withdrawn from the line for reorganisation and rest in October at the insistence of Prime Minister Billy Hughes. It remained out of the line until the armistice in November. With the end of hostilities, the battalion was slowly demobilised and was disbanded in 1919; its last soldier returned to Australia in September that year. During the war, the battalion had suffered 475 killed and 1,714 wounded (including gassed). A total of 14 battle honours were awarded to the 40th Battalion for its service during the war; these were bestowed upon the unit in 1927.

=== Inter war years and subsequent service ===
In 1921, after a review of Australia's military requirements, the decision was made to perpetuate the battle honours and traditions of the AIF battalions that had served during World War I by reorganising the Citizens Force along AIF lines, with previously existing part-time units adopting the numerical designations of the AIF units that had been drawn from their traditional recruitment territories. In May 1921, the battalion was reformed in Tasmania from the 2nd Battalion, 40th Infantry Regiment, which drew its lineage from the 93rd Infantry Regiment. Through this link, the battalion inherited a battle honour for service during the Boer War. Upon formation it was assigned to the 12th Brigade, within the 6th Military District. In 1927, when territorial designations were introduced, the battalion adopted the title of the "Derwent Regiment" and the motto of Pro Aris Et Focis. In 1930, the 40th Battalion was allied to the Prince of Wales' Volunteers (South Lancashire).

Initially, the Citizen Forces was maintained through a mixture of voluntary and compulsory service; however, in 1930, the Universal Training Scheme was abolished by the Scullin Labor government and was replaced by a volunteer-only Militia. Despite the austerity of the 1930s that led to the disbandment or amalgamation of many units, the battalion remained in existence throughout the inter war years, undertaking weekend parades, training courses and annual camps, although opportunities remained limited due to a lack of funding and volunteers.

During the Second World War, the 40th Battalion, with an authorised strength of between 800 and 900, was mobilised for full-time service in 1943, but was not sent overseas to fight due to the provisions of the Defence Act. Nevertheless, under the command of Lieutenant Colonel Thomas Bartley, it remained on the order of battle, as part of the 12th Brigade, variously assigned to the 4th and 12th Divisions, and undertook defensive duties until 2 May 1945 when it was amalgamated with the 12th Battalion to become the 12th/40th Battalion, which was subsequently disbanded on 29 May 1946. In 1953, the 40th Battalion was reformed, adopting Invercargill as its regimental march, but in 1960 it was subsumed into the Royal Tasmania Regiment, forming 'B' Company in the Pentropically organised 1st Battalion, Royal Tasmania Regiment. In 1961, the battalion was entrusted with the battle honours awarded to the 2/40th Battalion – a Second Australian Imperial Force unit – for its involvement in the fighting on Timor during the Second World War. The battalion was re-raised as the 40th Battalion, Royal Tasmania Regiment, in 1972 but three years later it was reduced to an independent company. It was amalgamated once again with the 12th, itself an independent rifle company, in 1987 to form the 12th/40th Battalion, Royal Tasmania Regiment, a battalion of the Australian Army Reserve.

== Alliances ==
The 40th Battalion held the following alliances:

- United Kingdom – Prince of Wales' Volunteers (South Lancashire): 1930–52;
- United Kingdom – The South Lancashire Regiment (The Prince of Wales' Volunteers): 1952–55;
- United Kingdom – The Lancashire Regiment (The Prince of Wales' Volunteers): 1955–60.

== Battle honours ==
The 40th Battalion received the following battle honours:

- South Africa 1899–1902 (inherited);
- Messines 1917, Ypres 1917, Polygon Wood, Broodeseinde, Poelcappelle, Passchendaele, Somme 1918, Ancre 1918, Amiens, Albert 1918, Mont St Quentin, Hindenburg Line, St Quentin Canal, France and Flanders 1916–18.
- South West Pacific 1942, Koepang (inherited).
