= 12th Brigade (Australia) =

Formation of the Australian Army

12th Infantry Brigade
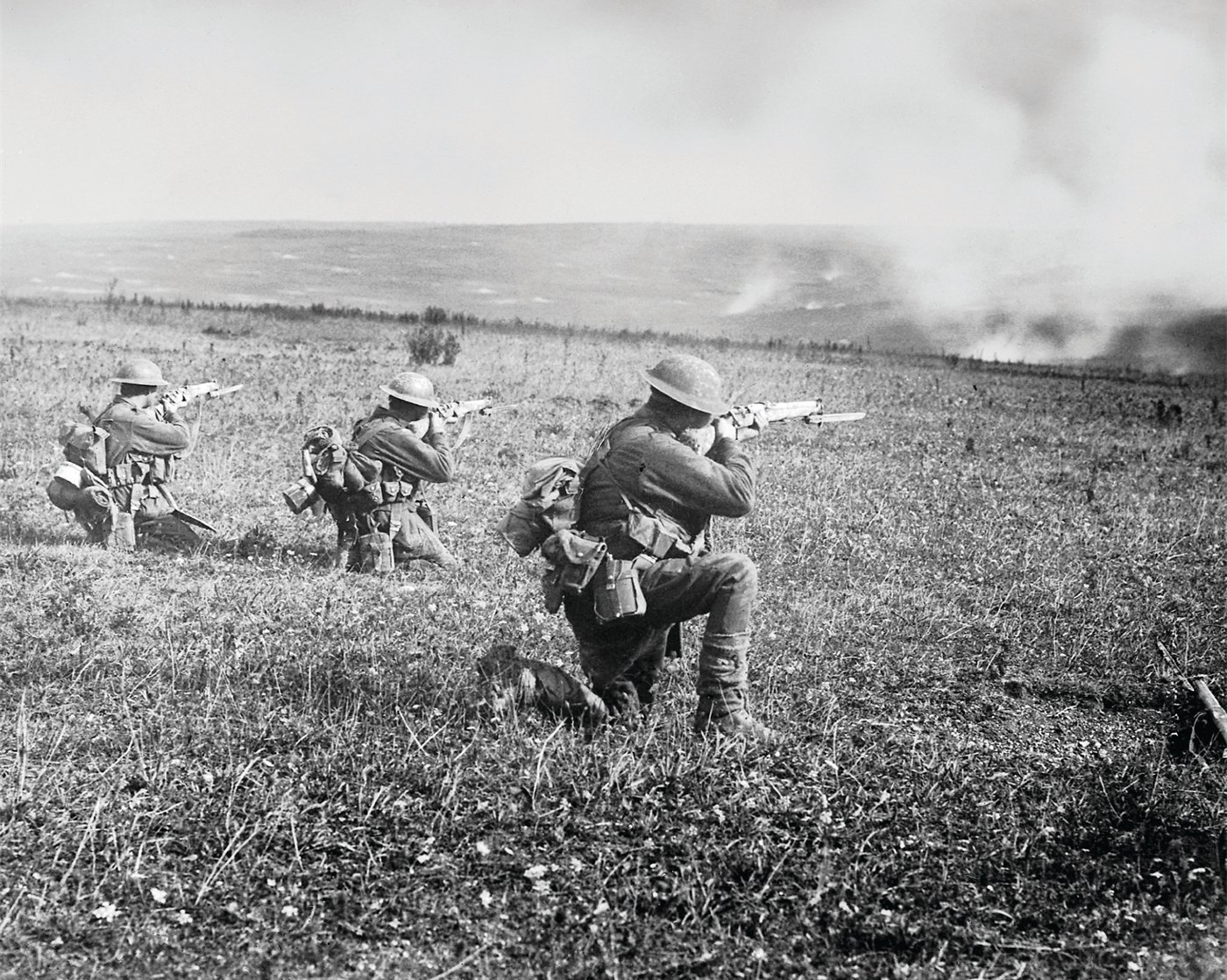
- Members of the 45th Battalion at the Battle of the Hindenburg Line
- Active: 1912–1919; 1921–1945
- Country: Australia
- Branch: Australian Army
- Type: Infantry
- Size: Brigade
- Part of: 4th Division; Northern Territory Force
- Engagements: First World War: Western Front; Second World War

Commanders
- Notable commanders: Brigadier Eric Vowles; Brigadier Robert Winning

Insignia
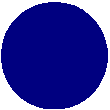
- Unit colour patch

The 12th Brigade was an infantry brigade of the Australian Army. Formed in 1912 as a Militia formation, it was later re-raised in 1916 as part of the all volunteer First Australian Imperial Force that was raised for overseas service during the First World War. The brigade was part of the 4th Division and fought on the Western Front until the end of the war in November 1918. During the inter-war years, the brigade was re-formed in Australia as a part-time unit; during the Second World War, it was mobilised for full-time service, but did not serve overseas, undertaking garrison duties in Australia until 1945 when it was used to raise Timor Force.

== History ==
The 12th Brigade traces its origins to 1912, when it was formed as a Militia brigade as part of the introduction of the compulsory training scheme, assigned to the 3rd Military District. At this time, the brigade's constituent units were located at various locations throughout Victoria, including Oakleigh, Sale, Caulfield, Balaclava, Brighton, Toorak, Armadale, Auburn and Camberwell.

During World War I, the 12th Brigade was re-raised in early 1916 as part of the expansion of the all volunteer First Australian Imperial Force. The brigade was formed in Egypt from a cadre of experienced personnel who had served during the Gallipoli Campaign as part of the 4th Brigade. Attached to the 4th Division and consisting of four infantry battalions—the 45th, 46th, 47th and 48th Battalions—it served in the trenches of the Western Front from June 1916 onwards. During this time, the brigade fought in several significant battles including the Battle of Pozières, the First Battle of Bullecourt, the Battle of Messines, the Battle of Passchendaele, and the German spring offensive. During the German spring offensive, the brigade fought a defensive action around Dernancourt. In May 1918, the brigade was one of three that was selected to disband one of its battalions in order to provide reinforcements to other units in the Australian Corps and it was at this time that the 47th Battalion was disbanded. The 12th Brigade's remaining battalions continued to fight after this, taking part in the final Allied offensive of the war, the Hundred Days Offensive, which was launched around Amiens in August and followed by a series of advances as the Allies broke through the Hindenburg Line.

Following the end of hostilities, the brigade was disbanded in early 1919 as part of the demobilisation of the AIF. In 1921, the Australian government decided to reorganise the nation's part-time military forces in order to replicate the numerical designations and structure of the AIF. As a result, the 12th Brigade was re-raised at this time as part of the 6th Military District in Tasmania as a unit of the Citizens Force. Headquartered Hobart, the brigade consisted of the 12th, 40th, 51st, and 52nd Infantry Battalions, and the 22nd Light Horse Regiment. In 1924, the 12th Brigade was reorganised as the 12th Mixed Brigade, consisting of several infantry, artillery, engineer and light horse units. However, by 1928, the brigade consisted of only two infantry battalions: the 12th and 40th. Initially, the Citizens Forces units were maintained by a mixture of voluntary and compulsory service, but in 1929, the compulsory training scheme was suspended and the Citizens Force was re-formed as the "Militia", staffed on an all volunteer basis.

Upon the outbreak of the Second World War in September 1939, the brigade was stationed in Tasmania, where it served in a garrison role. At this time it consisted of two infantry battalions, an artillery regiment, an engineer field company and a light horse regiment. The brigade was mobilised for full time defensive service in December 1941, and was initially assigned to the defence of Hobart. By early 1943, the threat of invasion in the area had passed and the brigade was transferred to Yorkforce around Townsville, Queensland. The brigade was assigned to the 4th Division between April and June 1943, and then assigned to the Northern Territory Force, where it replaced the 23rd Brigade and served in a defensive capacity around Darwin. During this time the brigade's establishment was reduced from four battalions to three; however, the brigade's establishment changed a number of times. The following units were attached to the brigade at various times during the war: 22nd Light Horse, 40th Battalion, 12th/50th Battalion, 22nd Motor Regiment, 36th Battalion, 55th/53rd Battalion, 38th Battalion, 10th/48th Battalion, 12th/40th Battalion. As the war progressed, the size of the Darwin garrison was greatly reduced as other formations were disbanded or transferred to take part in combat operations in the Pacific. At war's end in August 1945, the 12th Brigade was used to form Timor Force, accepting the Japanese surrender.

== See also ==
- List of Australian Army brigades
