= David Blake (general) =

Australian Army general

David Valentine Jardine Blake
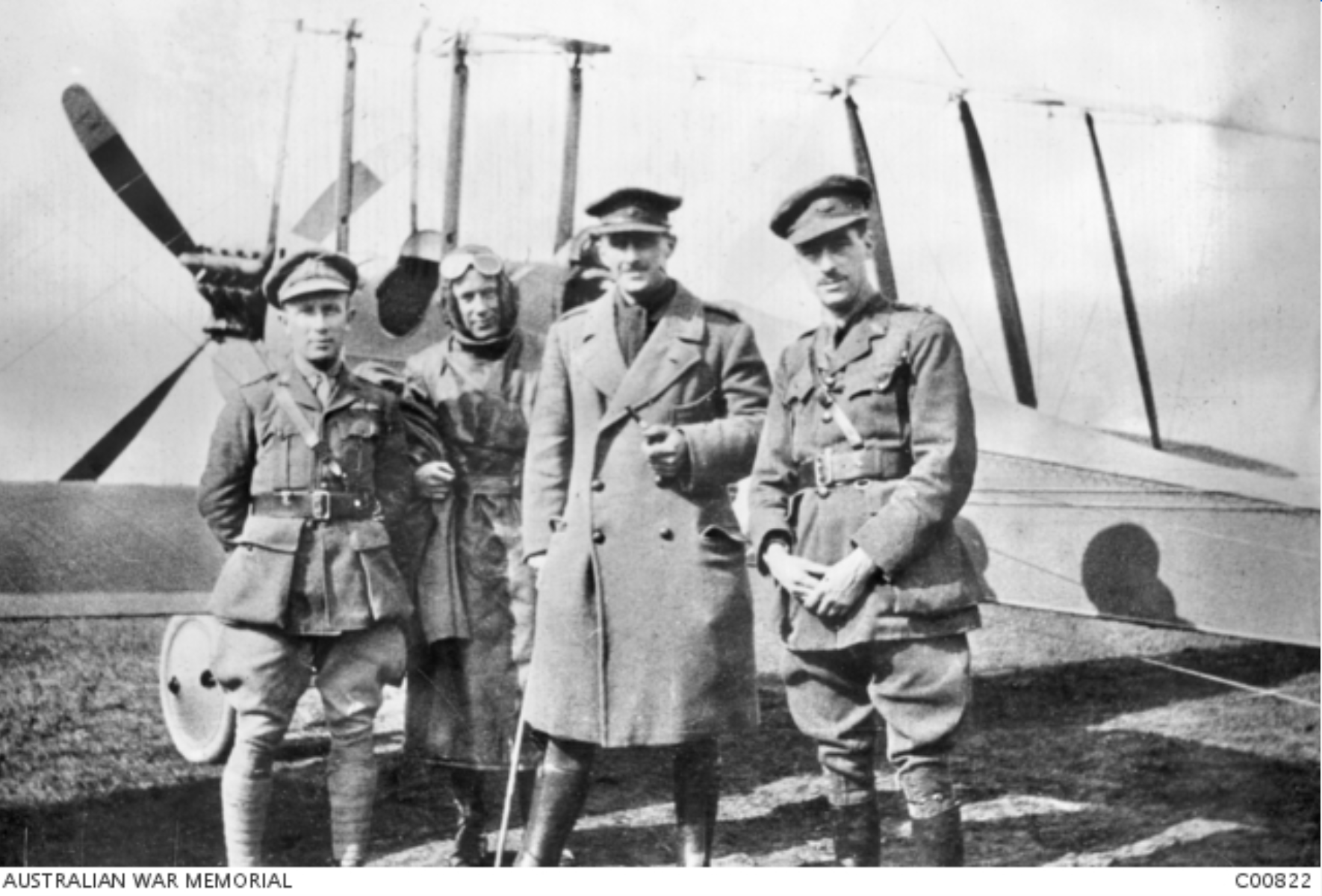
- Major David Valentine Blake (2nd from right), officer commanding 3 Squadron, Australian Flying Corps, with unnamed officers
- Born: 10 November 1887; Parramatta, Colony of New South Wales
- Died: 6 March 1965 (aged 77); Newtown, New South Wales
- Military career
- Allegiance: Australia
- Branch: Australian Army
- Service years: 1911–1947
- Rank: Major General
- Commands: 7th Military District (1941–42); Australian Flying Corps Training Depot (1919); No. 3 Squadron AFC (1916–18)
- Conflicts: First World War; Second World War; Bombing of Darwin
- Awards: Mentioned in Despatches (2); Distinguished Service Medal (United States)

Major General David Valentine Jardine Blake (10 November 1887 – 6 March 1965) was a senior commander of the Australian Army who served in both world wars.

== Early life ==
David Blake was born on 10 November 1887 in Parramatta, New South Wales. He was educated at Marist Brothers, Parramatta.

== First World War ==
Blake was commissioned as a career officer in the Australian Army's Permanent Military Forces in 1911. In September 1916, as a major, he became the first commanding officer of the newly formed No. 3 Squadron Australian Flying Corps (then part of the army). The squadron was deployed to Belgium and France in late 1917, performing a combined reconnaissance and offensive role.

From early 1918, No. 3 Squadron flew in a sector of the Somme Valley, facing German planes commanded by the "Red Baron", Manfred von Richthofen. When the baron was shot down and killed behind allied lines on 21 April 1918, the disposal of his remains became Blake's responsibility. Blake initially reported that a 3 Sqn R.E.8 may have shot down Richthofen. However, following an autopsy, Blake became a strong proponent of the view that ground-based Australian machine-gunners had killed the baron. Blake remained 3 Sqn CO until October 1918. The following year, he was transferred to Australia.

== Second World War ==
After the outbreak of the Second World War, Blake's first significant command (as a major general) was Officer Commanding, 7th Military District (the Northern Territory), based in Darwin, from September 1941. The post gained in importance when war with Japan broke out in December. In January 1942, Blake's position was incorporated into the short-lived American-British-Dutch-Australian Command.

Blake was the senior Allied officer present during the first air raids on Darwin on 19 February 1942. In the wake of the initial Japanese raids—and fearing a surface attack—Blake decided to remove all Allied forces from central Darwin and other coastal areas. He was later criticised for this decision, as withdrawing from a major supply node was considered a cardinal error in military theory. Later that year, as a major Allied build-up in northern Australia got underway, Blake was moved to the position of General Officer Commanding, Lines of Communication, Northern Territory Area.

Blake retired from the army in 1947.
