= Royal Tasmania Regiment =

Australian Army reserve unit

The Royal Tasmania Regiment
- Cap badge of the Royal Tasmania Regiment
- Active: 1 July 1960 – present
- Country: Australia
- Branch: Army
- Type: Light infantry
- Size: One battalion
- Part of: 4th Brigade
- Garrison/HQ: 12th/40th Battalion – Hobart
- Mottos: Pro Aris Et Focis (For Altars and Hearths)
- March: Captain Oldfield/Invercargill

Commanders
- Current commander: LTCOL Andrew Stewart
- Current RSM: WO1 James Stewart
- Regimental Colonel: MAJGEN SL Smith, AM, CSC, RFD

Insignia
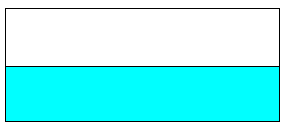
- Unit colour patch
- Abbreviation: RTR

The Royal Tasmania Regiment (RTR) is a Reserve infantry regiment within the Australian Army consisting of a single battalion. Formed in 1960 following a review of military formations in Australia, the Regiment can trace its lineage back to the late 19th Century and has served Australia in a number of conflicts including the Boer War, World War I and World War II. Today it serves as a part of the Australian Army's 4th Brigade, 2nd Division.

== History ==
The Royal Tasmania Regiment was formed in 1960 as part of the reforms that saw the old Citizens Military Force reorganised along pentropic lines into what is now known as the Army Reserve. As part of this reform, Tasmania's two single-battalion infantry regiments were amalgamated, to form the Royal Tasmania Regiment. These two parent regiments were:

- 12th Infantry Battalion (The Launceston Regiment)
- 40th Infantry Battalion (The Derwent Regiment)

The two battalions were reduced to companies within a single battalion named as the Tasmania Regiment. The regiment was given its royal title the same year.

In 1972, the RTR expanded to two battalions, when both the 12th and 40th were reformed. However, this lasted only until 1975, when it was again reduced, this time to a pair of independent rifle companies, 12th IRC and 40th IRC. Then, in November 1987, the regiment was expanded to a full battalion again through the regimentation of the two independent rifle companies, 12 Field Squadron Royal Australian Engineers, 146 Signal Squadron and 6 Intelligence Unit, forming as 12th/40th Battalion.

== Lineage ==
The Regiment's lineage can be traced back to 1878 when the Tasmanian Volunteer Rifle Regiment was formed in Tasmania with four companies in Hobart and two in Launceston. The current Regiment has evolved since that time, albeit under a variety of titles and organisations. The Tasmanian Rifle Regiment of Southern Tasmania, the Launceston Rifle Regiment of Northern Tasmania, and an Auxiliary Force (Enrolled Pensioner Force) were combined as the three battalions of the Tasmania Volunteer Rifle Regiment in 1897. These were: 1st Battalion, Tasmania Infantry Regiment which was formed in the south, the 2nd Battalion TIR which was formed in the north, and the 3rd Battalion TIR which was formed in the north-west.

In 1899 the first contingent of Tasmanians departed for the Second Boer War. During this conflict, two men of the 1st Tasmanian Imperial Bushmen had the distinction of earning the first Victoria Crosses (VC) to be awarded to Australian infantrymen. For this campaign and the contingents that followed afterward, the Regiment holds the Battle Honours of 'South Africa 1899–1902' and '1900–1902'.

Following Federation, the titles of the battalions were changed; in the south to the Derwent Infantry Regiment (Derwent Regiment), in the north to the 12th Infantry Regiment (Launceston Regiment) and in the North-West to the Tasmanian Rangers.

During World War I the 12th and 40th Battalions were raised as part of the Australian Imperial Force and these units went on to serve with considerable distinction overseas. Their sacrifice earned the two Battalions three Theatre Honours and 25 Battle Honours, which continue to be held by the Regiment to this day. After the war, the two Battalions were demobilised and reformed as Militia units.

At the outbreak of World War II the 2nd Australian Imperial Force was formed and as part of this the 2/12th and 2/40th Battalions were raised (distinct from the militia battalions that had the same numerical designation). These battalions were also deployed for overseas service, and during the course of the war, they earned two Theatre Honours, a Campaign Honour and 13 Battle Honours. Of note, the 2/12th Battalion fought during the Defence of Tobruk, and later at Milne Bay. The 2/40th Battalion gave also distinguished service, serving in Timor as part of the ill-fated Sparrow Force where, surrounded and outnumbered, they mounted a spirited defence against the Japanese but were ultimately forced to surrender in February 1942.

During World War II, the militia battalions formed at the end of World War I from units of the original AIF were maintained as separate units from the battalions raised as part of the 2nd AIF. The 12th/50th Battalion was the direct descendant of the 12th Battalion, AIF, and during the war, it served as part of York Force and on garrison duties in the Northern Territory. At the same time, the 40th Battalion also served in Darwin. On 2 May 1945, the 12th/50th Battalion was amalgamated with the 40th Battalion and became the 12th/40th Battalion. This Battalion formed the bulk of Timor Force that accepted the surrender of the Japanese forces from the commander of the 48th Japanese Division at Koepang on 3 October 1945. In March 1946, it returned to Australia and was subsequently disbanded on 29 May 1946.

On 1 July 1948, the 12th/40th Battalion was raised again as part of the Citizen Military Forces. On 30 June 1951, this Battalion was separated and became the 1st and 2nd Battalions, The Tasmania Regiment. On 1 July 1960, The Tasmania Regiment was granted the Royal prefix and became The Royal Tasmania Regiment.

== Royal Tasmania Regiment today ==
The 12th/40th Battalion, The Royal Tasmania Regiment, is part of 4 Brigade, with battalion headquarters at Anglesea Barracks, Hobart, Alpha Company based in Launceston at Youngtown Barracks and Bravo Company is based in Hobart at Derwent Barracks. The battalion serves in the light infantry role as part of 2 Division, Australia's main home defence formation.

The unit is proud of its history within the 9th Brigade and 2nd Division for performing at a consistently high standard. This is supported by successes in past years in 9th Brigade and 2nd Division military skills competitions and strong showings on major Brigade activities. The regiment was transferred to 4th Brigade on 26 July 2022. The participation rate of soldiers within major exercises is as high as any other unit and better than many other Army Reserve units nationally. Today the soldiers and officers of the 12th/40th Battalion have served overseas in the Solomon Islands under Operation Anode, Timor Leste under Operation Astute, Iraq and the Middle East under Operation Catalyst and Afghanistan under Operation Slipper as part of larger contingents.

The battalion wears a blue and black lanyard, which comes from its links to the 12th and 40th Battalions. However, the unit's colour patch is that of the 12th Battalion, 1st Australian Imperial Force, which is white over sky blue. The regiment holds the colours of both the 12th and 40th Battalions. The Honorary Colonel of the Regiment is Her Excellency the Governor of Tasmania.

Motto:

"Pro Aris Et Focis" – "For God and Our Country" or literally "For Altars and Hearths".

Regimental Marches:

The Royal Tasmania Regiment – "The Southlanders" 12th Battalion – "Captain Oldfield" 40th Battalion – "Invercargill"

Unit Mascot:

The unit mascot is a Sarcophilus harrisii, commonly known as the Tasmanian devil named TX 666 PTE Bluey Devil IV.

Freedom of Cities:

The Battalion holds the right of Freedom of Entry to the City of Hobart, granted on 5 February 1993.

The City of Launceston granted the 12th Independent Rifle Company, one of the units which formed 12th/40th Battalion, the Freedom of Entry on 22 November 1986.

== Battle honours ==
Although now an Australian Army Reserve battalion, the 12th/40th holds 47 official Battle and Theatre honours. A number of which are displayed on the Queen's and Regimental Colours.

- Boer War: South Africa 1899–1902, South Africa 1900–1902.
- World War I: Anzac, Landing at Anzac, Defence of Anzac, Suvla, Sari Bair–Lone Pine, Gallipoli 1915, Egypt 1915–17, Somme 1916, Messines 1917, Pozières, Bullecourt, Ypres 1917, Menin Road, Polygon Wood, Broodseinde, Poelcappelle, Somme 1918, Passchendaele, Lys, Ancre 1918, Hazebrouck, Amiens, Albert 1918, Mont St Quentin, Hindenburg Line, St Quentin Canal, Epehy, France and Flanders 1916–1918.
- World War II: North Africa 1941, Defence of Tobruk, The Salient 1941, South West Pacific 1942, Koepang, South West Pacific 1942–45, Buna-Gona, Sanananda Road, Cape Endaiadere-Sinemi Creek, Sanananda – Cape Killerton, Milne Bay, Goodenough Island, Liberation of Australian New Guinea, Shaggy Ridge, Finisterres, Borneo, Balikpapan.

== Alliances ==
The Royal Tasmanian Regiment currently maintains the following alliances:

- United Kingdom — The Royal Anglian Regiment
- United Kingdom — The Duke of Lancaster's Regiment (King's Lancashire and Border)
- New Zealand — The Wellington West Coast and Taranaki Regiment

https://www.youtube.com/watch?time_continue=71&v=GrRGwQZBe5Q&feature=emb_title
