= 12th Battalion (Australia) =

Australian Army infantry battalion

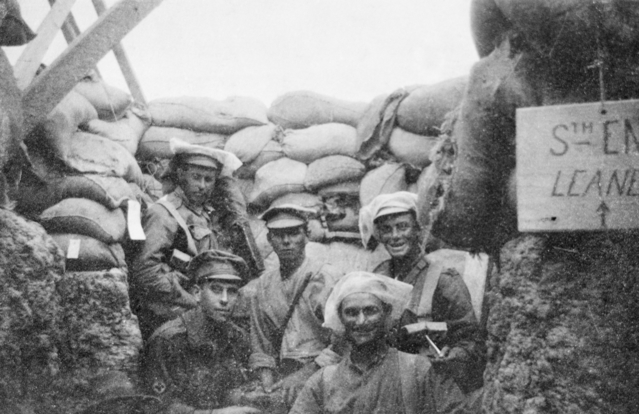
- A 12th Battalion observation team at Gallipoli in August 1915
- Active: 1914–1919; 1921–1936; 1953–1960; 1972–1975
- Country: Australia
- Branch: Australian Army
- Type: Infantry
- Role: Line infantry
- Part of: 3rd Brigade, 1st Division
- Motto(s): Ducit Amor Patriae (Love of My Country Leads Me)
- Colours: White over blue
- March: Captain Oldfield
- Engagements: World War I: Gallipoli Campaign; Western Front

Commanders
- Notable commanders: John Gellibrand

Insignia
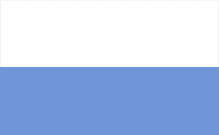
- Unit colour patch

The 12th Battalion was an infantry battalion originally raised for the First Australian Imperial Force during the First World War. The battalion was recruited from Tasmania, South Australia and Western Australia and formed part of the 3rd Brigade, 1st Division. It served throughout the war, firstly during the Gallipoli Campaign and then on the Western Front. During the interwar years, the 12th Battalion was re-raised as a part-time military unit and during the Second World War undertook garrison duties in Australia, but did not see combat. Today its lineage is perpetuated by the 12th/40th Battalion, Royal Tasmania Regiment, a unit which continues to serve in the Australian Army Reserve.

== History ==
=== First World War ===
The battalion was raised as part of the all volunteer Australian Imperial Force (AIF) within three weeks of the declaration of war in August 1914, and left Australia just two months later. Part of the 3rd Brigade, 1st Division it was formed from recruits from Tasmania, South Australia and Western Australia. Under the command of Lieutenant Colonel Lancelot Clarke, the battalion proceeded to Egypt on HMAT A2 Geelong, arriving on 2 December. A period of training in the desert followed to prepare the Australian forces for their eventual transfer to Europe, but in late April they were committed to the Gallipoli Campaign. The 3rd Brigade was the covering force for the Anzac landing on 25 April 1915, and went ashore at around 4.30 am. During the early fighting on the first, the battalion's commanding officer was killed by a sniper.

After the initial landing, a stalemate developed around the beachhead and in August the Allies sought to break the deadlock by launching the August Offensive. As a part of this, the 12th contributed two companies to the diversionary attack on Lone Pine. The offensive failed, but the campaign continued and the battalion remained served on the Gallipoli Peninsula until early December when it was withdrawn to Lemnos Island for rest. While there, Lieutenant Colonel John Gellibrand took command of the battalion.

In late December, the Allied forces were evacuated from Gallipoli and the battalion returned to Egypt in January 1916, where the AIF was reorganised and expanded. During this process, the 12th Battalion provided an experienced cadre of troops to the newly raised 52nd Battalion. In March 1916, the AIF's infantry divisions were transferred to the Western Front, and after arriving in France, the 12th Battalion deployed to the Somme. The battalion's first major action in France was at Pozières in July 1916. Later the battalion fought at Ypres, in Belgium, before returning to the Somme in winter. In 1917, the battalion returned to Belgium to take part the Third Battle of Ypres.

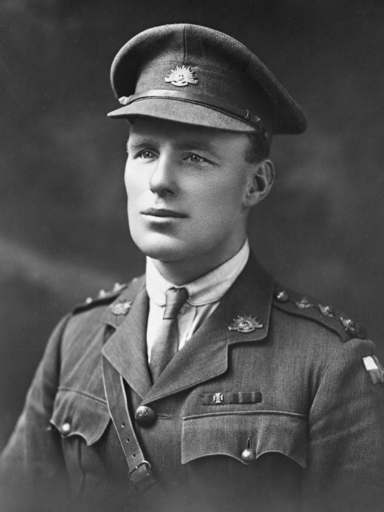
James Newland, one of the 12th Battalion's two Victoria Cross recipients

In 1918, the battalion helped to stop the German Spring Offensive that was launched in March and April. The battalion subsequently participated in the last Allied offensive of 1918, launched near Amiens on 8 August 1918. After Amiens, a series of advances followed as the Allies broke through the Hindenburg Line. The battalion continued operations until late September 1918 when it was withdrawn from the line for rest. Following the end of the war members of the battalion began returning to Australia in November for demobilisation and discharge. The 12th Battalion was disbanded in 1919 having sustained casualties of 1,135 killed and 2,422 wounded. Two members of the battalion received the Victoria Cross for their actions during the war: James Newland and John Whittle.

=== Inter war years and subsequent service ===
In 1921, the battalion was re-raised as part the re-organisation of the Australian military that took place at that time. Upon re-forming, the battalion formed part of the 12th Brigade, which was formed within the 6th Military District headquartered in Tasmania. In 1927, it received the title "The Launceston Regiment". The battalion was subsequently amalgamated with the 50th Battalion as the "12th/50th Battalion (The Launceston Regiment/The Tasmanian Rangers)" on 1 December 1936. During the Second World War, the two battalions remained linked, serving as part of York Force and undertaking garrison duties in the Northern Territory. On 2 May 1945 the 12th/50th Battalion was amalgamated with the 40th Battalion ("The Derwent Regiment") and became the 12th/40th Battalion. The battalion was disbanded in 1946, having not seen combat during the war.

Reformed in 1948 as part of the Citizens Military Force, the 12/40th Battalion was unlinked in 1953 with both battalions being reformed in their own right at that time. In 1961, the 12th Battalion was awarded the Second World War battle honours of the 2/12th Battalion (AIF). The battalion was granted the freedom of the City of Launceston in May 1960. In the early 1960s, the Australian Army adopted the Pentropic divisional establishment, which resulted in the regionally-based regiments being subsumed into larger State-based regiments. As a result, the 12th Battalion formed 'A' Company within the Pentropically organised 1st Battalion, The Royal Tasmania Regiment (1 RTR). In 1972, 1 RTR was split up and the 12th and 40th Battalions reformed, but this was only short lived as both formations were reduced to independent rifle companies in 1975. The 12th and 40th Independent Rifle Companies were amalgamated in 1987 as part of a reorganisation of Australia's reserve infantry force, forming the 12th/40th Battalion, Royal Tasmania Regiment, a unit which continues to serve in the Australian Army Reserve.

== Alliances ==
The 12th Battalion held the following alliances:

- United Kingdom – 1st East Anglian Regiment (Royal Norfolk and Suffolk).

== Battle honours ==
The 12th Battalion received the following battle honours:

- First World War: Somme 1916–18; Pozières; Bullecourt; Ypres 1917; Menin Road; Polygon Wood; Broodseinde; Poelcappelle; Passchendaele; Lys; Hazebrouck; Amiens; Albert 1918; Hindenburg Line; Epéhy; France and Flanders 1916–18; Anzac; Landing at Anzac; Defence of Anzac; Suvla; Sari Bair–Lone Pine; Gallipoli, 1915; Egypt, 1915–16.
- Second World War: North Africa 1941; Defence of Tobruk; The Salient 1941; South West Pacific 1942–45; Buna–Gona; Sanananda Road; Cape Endaiadere–Sinemi Creek; Sanananda–Cape Killerton; Milne Bay; Goodenough Island; Liberation of Australian New Guinea; Shaggy Ridge; Finisterres; Borneo; Balikpapan.
