= Percy Statton =

Australian Victoria Cross recipient

Percy Clyde Statton VC, MM
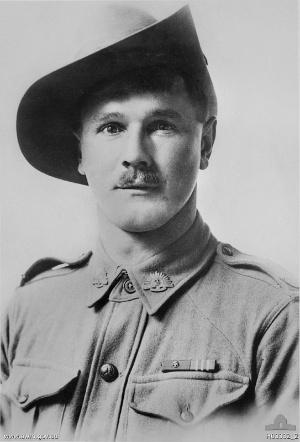
- Sergeant Percy Statton c. 1919
- Born: 21 October 1890; Beaconsfield, Tasmania
- Died: 5 December 1959 (aged 69); Hobart, Tasmania
- Military career
- Allegiance: Australia
- Branch: Australian Imperial Force; Volunteer Defence Corps
- Service years: 1916–1920; 1942–1946
- Rank: Lieutenant
- Conflicts: First World War; Western Front; Battle of Messines; Battle of Passchendaele; German spring offensive; Battle of Mont St. Quentin; Second World War
- Awards: Victoria Cross; Military Medal

Percy Clyde Statton, VC, MM (21 October 1890 – 5 December 1959) was an Australian farmer, soldier, and a recipient of the Victoria Cross, the highest decoration for gallantry "in the face of the enemy" that can be awarded to members of the British and Commonwealth armed forces. Serving as a sergeant during the First World War, Statton was awarded the Victoria Cross in 1918 following his assault on four German machine guns. With three men, Statton rushed the posts armed with only a revolver and succeeded in capturing the first gun. Moving to the second, he killed the crew of five himself before the two remaining gun crews were forced to retreat.

Born in Tasmania, Statton was married and working as a farmer when he enlisted in the Australian Imperial Force in 1916. Posted to the 40th Battalion, he was shipped to England, where he spent three months training. Arriving on the Western Front in 1917, Statton was awarded the Military Medal during the Battle of Messines for leading carrying parties to the front line under heavy artillery and machine gun fire. Wounded twice during the war, Statton returned to Australia in 1919 and was discharged the following year. In 1934, he took part in rescue work aiding families isolated by severe bushfires in the Derwent Valley. Following a period of service during the Second World War, Statton died of stomach cancer in 1959.

== Early life ==
Statton was born in Beaconsfield, Tasmania, on 21 October 1890 to Edward Statton, a miner, and his wife Maggie Lavinia (née Hoskins). He was educated at Zeehan State School, before gaining employment as a farmer in Tyenna. Giving his age as twenty-one, Statton married Elsie May Pearce in a Methodist ceremony on 12 September 1907; the couple later had a son and two daughters.

== First World War ==
Despite his wife's disapproval, Statton enlisted in the Australian Imperial Force on 29 February 1916, and was allotted to the newly raised 40th Battalion as a private. Appointed lance corporal on 22 May, Statton embarked from Hobart aboard HMAT Berrima on 1 July, bound for England. The troopship disembarked at Devonport a little over seven weeks later, where the 40th Battalion spent the next three months training.

Promoted to corporal on 19 November 1916, Statton embarked along with the rest of the 40th Battalion for France and the Western Front four days later. Initially posted to Le Havre, the battalion was transferred to Flanders in Belgium in early 1917. Statton was promoted to temporary sergeant on 16 January 1917, which was made substantive from 26 April. In June, the 40th Battalion took part in the Battle of Messines.

Over a three-day period during the engagement at Messines from 7–9 June, Statton was placed in charge of supervising and leading carrying parties to the front line. Throughout this work, he was subject to heavy German artillery and machine gun fire, and on several occasions the party was decimated by shellfire. Despite this, the parties managed to reach the front line on every occasion. For his actions, Statton was awarded the Military Medal, the recommendation for which cited his "exceptional fine work and gallant conduct". The notification of the award was published in a supplement to the London Gazette on 16 August 1917.

On 12 October 1917, Statton was involved in operations during the First Battle of Passchendaele when he suffered a gunshot wound to his right shoulder. First admitted to the 22nd General Hospital, Douane, Statton was transferred to the VAD Hospital, Tonbridge, as the wound required treatment in England. Having sufficiently recovered after a period of hospitalisation at the Fort Pitt Military Hospital, Chatham, and 3rd Auxiliary Hospital, Dartford, Statton was granted two weeks' leave from 28 January 1918. Returning to duty, he was attached to the Overseas Training Brigade at Longbridge Deverill prior to re-embarking on 1 May for France, where he rejoined the 40th Battalion.

While in action around the village of Villers-Bretonneux on 10 June, Statton was wounded in a gas attack on his position. Initially admitted to the 10th Australian Field Ambulance, he was transferred to the 40th Casualty Clearing Station six days later, before returning to the 40th Battalion on 24 June. Beginning on 8 July, Statton was placed on a five-day attachment to a demonstration platoon at the 10th Brigade Headquarters. Returning to his battalion, he was attached to the United States 3rd Battalion, 130th Regiment, for service over a seven-day period later that month. He rejoined the 40th Battalion on 27 July.

=== Victoria Cross ===
Between 10–12 August 1918, the 3rd Australian Division—of which the 40th Battalion was part—was ordered to attack from an easterly direction against the southern bank of the Somme River, and advance along the road past Proyart. On 12 August, the 40th Battalion was tasked with the objective of seizing and holding a valley to the south of the Proyart–Chuignes road. The advance entailed moving the battalion across approximately 1,300 metres (1,400 yd) of open ground, while under the direct observation of German forces on high ground to the east of Proyart. At the same time, the 37th Battalion was to move through the village of Proyart itself, and proceed to a line just beyond the railway to the north of the Proyart–Chuignes road. It was during this action that Statton was to earn the Victoria Cross.

The 40th Battalion began its attack at approximately 07:30, and by 08:30 had successfully advanced 800 metres (870 yd). It was at this point, however, that the unit came under an intense barrage from German artillery, and were prevented from moving further forward. With assistance from a Lewis Gun team under Statton's command, the battalion's A Company managed to reach the centre of Proyart village an hour later. The remainder of the 40th Battalion attempted to follow, but soon became subject to heavy machine gun fire. With his Lewis Gun, Statton engaged two German machine gun posts and thus enabled the remainder of his battalion to continue its advance. The battalion was later able to reach its objectives.

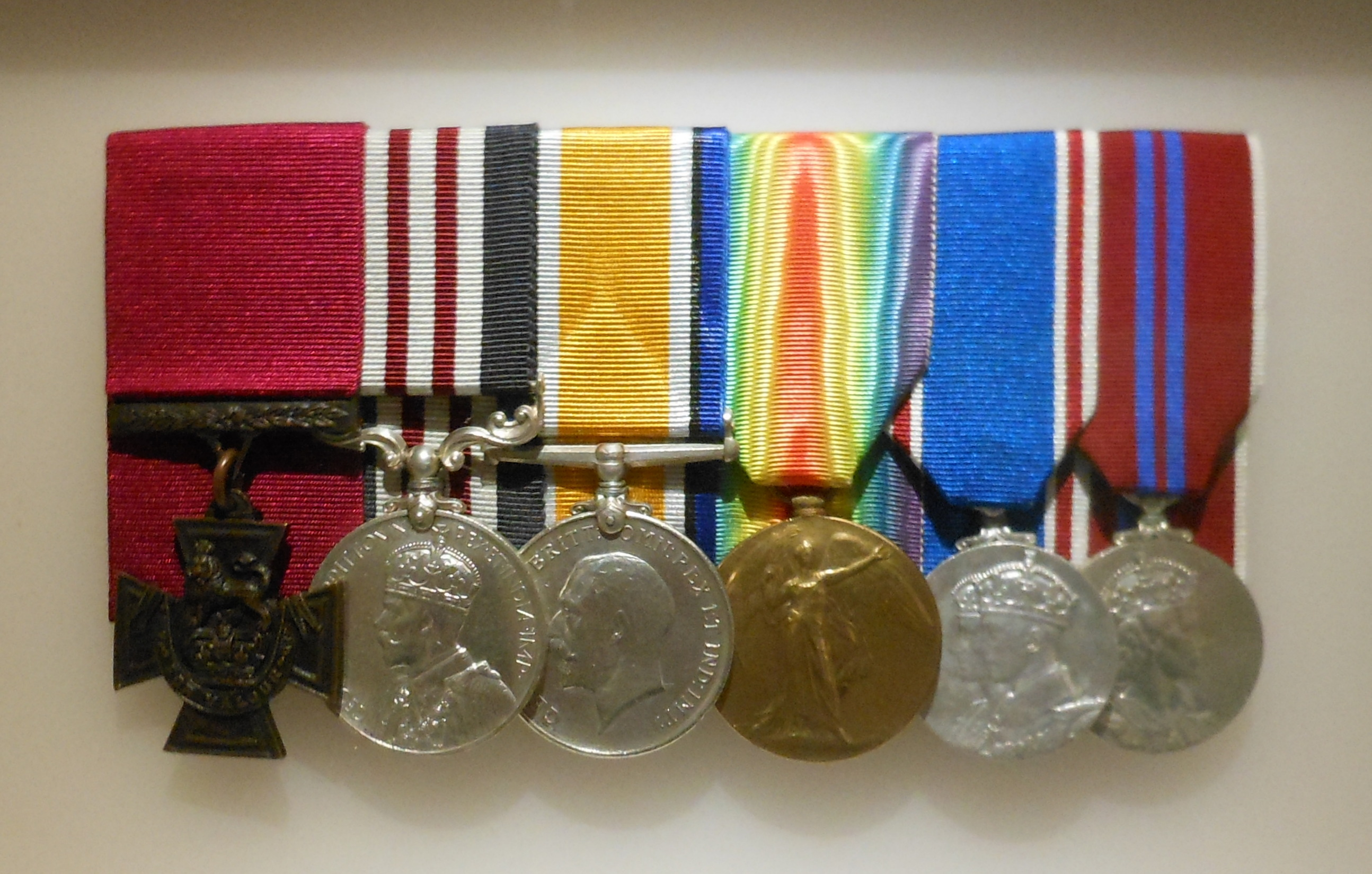
Percy Statton's medals at the Australian War Memorial, Canberra

At 18:00, the 40th Battalion received a message that the 37th Battalion was about to attempt to advance from the village to its own objective. From his position, Statton observed a line of German machine gunners firing on the 37th Battalion and preventing its advance. He turned his Lewis Guns on them in an attempt to assist a party of men from the 37th as they attacked. Having failed, a party of thirteen men were assembled and rushed the position soon after, but the group was wiped out before they reached the first gun. Gathering Corporal Upchurch and Privates Leslie Styles and Beard, Statton worked his way along under the cover of the Chuignes road embankment. Reaching within 75 metres (82 yd) of the machine gunners and armed with only a revolver, Statton led the three men as they rushed across the open ground towards the German strongpoint. Reaching the position, the party was able to dispose of the first gun and its crew before moving onto the second, where Statton personally shot four of the five crew members and bayoneted the fifth with his own rifle. Seeing this, the two remaining gun teams began to retreat but were killed by Statton's Lewis Gunners.

Soon after, another German machine gun opened up, killing Private Styles and wounding Corporal Upchurch. With Private Beard, Statton began to crawl back to his own lines, while the inspired 37th Battalion continued its advance and cheered the pair as they went past. Later that evening, Statton, while under heavy machine gun fire, went out and retrieved the badly wounded Upchurch and the body of Styles. By 20:00, both battalions had reached and consolidated their positions, and were relieved by the British 17th Division the following day.

At 09:00 on 27 September 1918, the 40th Battalion was ordered onto parade by the unit's Commanding Officer, Lieutenant Colonel John Lord. Addressing the assembled crowd, Lord announced that that same day, the name of Sergeant Percy Statton would appear in the London Gazette announcing that he had been awarded the Victoria Cross. Described by the battalion's history as a "reluctant hero", Statton was granted three cheers before he was carried shoulder high through the ranks while the battalion band played. The full citation for Statton's Victoria Cross appeared in a supplement to the London Gazette later that day, reading:

War Office, 27th September 1918.

His Majesty the KING has been graciously pleased to approve of the award of the Victoria Cross to the undermentioned Officers, N.C.O.'s and Man: —

No. 506 Sjt. Percy Clyde Statton, M.M., A.I.F.

For most conspicuous bravery and initiative in action when in command of a platoon which reached its objective, the remainder of the battalion being held up by heavy machine-gun fire. He skilfully engaged two machine-gun posts with Lewis gun fire, enabling the remainder of his battalion to advance.

The advance of the battalion on his left had been brought to a standstill by heavy enemy machine-gun fire, and the first of our assaulting detachments to reach the machine-gun posts were put out of action in taking the first gun. Armed only with a revolver, in broad daylight, Sjt. Statton at once rushed four enemy machine-gun posts in succession, disposing of two of them, and killing five of the enemy. The remaining two posts retired and were wiped out by Lewis-gun fire.

Later in the evening, under heavy machine-gun fire, he went out again and brought in two badly wounded men.

Sjt. Statton set a magnificent example of quick decision, and the success of the attacking troops was largely due to his determined gallantry.

=== Later war service ===
From 20 October 1918, Statton was granted ten days' leave to Paris. Returning to the 40th Battalion, he was sent to Amiens the following day and attached to 4th Army Guard for special duties over a three-day period. Briefly re-joining his battalion, Statton was shipped to England on 5 November for special duties. During this time, the Armistice was signed officially declaring the war's end, and Statton was granted two weeks' leave in December.

Returning to France on 27 January 1919, Statton was attached to the Headquarters of the Australian Base Depot from 25 March. Shipped to England in June, Statton attended an investiture ceremony in the Quadrangle of Buckingham Palace, where he was presented with his Victoria Cross by King George V. During his time in England, Statton undertook a course at the Motor Training Institute in preparation for non-military employment, before he was granted a month's leave. Returning to duty on 24 September, Statton boarded HT Pakeha twelve days later and departed for Australia. The troopship arrived in Tasmania on 26 November and Statton was discharged from the Australian Imperial Force on 19 January 1920.

== Later life ==
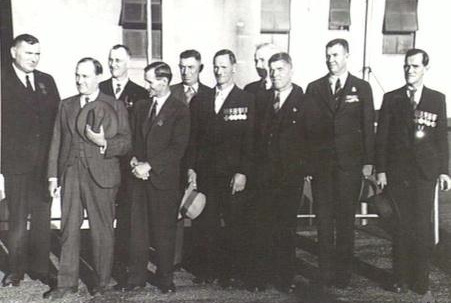
A group of Victoria Cross recipients gathered to march in the 1938 Sydney Anzac Day march. Statton is in the centre, fifth from right.

Following his discharge, Statton settled in Fitzgerald, Tasmania, where he gained employment in the timber industry. True to her word that she would leave him if he went off to war, Statton's wife divorced him on 1 October 1920. Five years later, on 21 December 1925, he married Eliza Grace Hudson (née Parker) at the Registrar General's Office, Hobart. In 1934, severe bushfires broke out in the Derwent Valley, and Statton took a prominent role in rescue work aiding families isolated by the fire.

During the Second World War, Statton enlisted for service with the Volunteer Defence Corps of the Australian Military Forces. Commissioned as a lieutenant on 18 June 1942, he served throughout the war with the 5th Battalion, Volunteer Defence Corps, until his discharge on 9 January 1946. Statton's wife died in 1945, and on 16 December 1947, he married Monica Enid Effie Kingston; the pair later had a son. The couple lived at Ouse, where Statton worked as a commercial agent and was a member of the local council.

In 1956, Statton joined the Australian contingent of Victoria Cross recipients who attended the parade in London's Hyde Park to commemorate the centenary of the institution of the award. At the Repatriation General Hospital, Hobart, on 5 December 1959, Statton died of stomach cancer. Accorded a full military funeral, Statton was cremated and his ashes interred at the Cornelian Bay Cemetery. His Victoria Cross is currently on display at the Australian War Memorial.
