= Eric Vowles =

Australian soldier

- Born: Eric Lacy Vowles; 13 July 1893; Kew, Victoria
- Died: 28 September 1977 (aged 84)
- Burial place: Garden of Remembrance, Pasadena, South Australia
- Military career
- Allegiance: Australia
- Branch: Australian Army
- Service years: 1911–1948
- Rank: Brigadier
- Commands: Royal Military College, Duntroon (1945–48); 12th Brigade (1943–44); 6th Military District (1942–43)
- Conflicts: First World War; Second World War
- Awards: Military Cross; Mentioned in Despatches (2); Silver Medal of Military Valour (Italy)

Brigadier Eric Lacy Vowles, MC (13 July 1893 – 28 September 1977) was an Australian soldier who served during the First and Second World Wars. Vowels served at Gallipoli, in France, Palestine, and New Guinea.

As its commandant for four years, he positioned Royal Military College, Duntroon for post war training. He retired from the Army on 13 June 1949.

== Early life and education ==
Vowels was born on 13 July 1893 in Melbourne, Victoria, the second son of Thomas Vowles and Mary, née Lacy. His mother died on 18 May 1908. Thomas Vowles was post master at Perth and later pay master at Melbourne GPO.

Vowels was educated at Scotch College, Perth. Vowles studied engineering before enlisting and was one of the original students in 1911 at the Royal Military College, Duntroon, graduating 28th in August 1914. As a cadet at RMC Duntroon, he designed the Corps of Staff Cadets badge. Vowels was appointed a lieutenant in November 1914.

His older brother, Alan, was also a decorated officer.

== Personal life ==
Vowels and his wife had two children, a son Robert, and a daughter Prudence, (Note: known as Prue.) a librarian who had worked for a time at the RMC Duntroon library.

== Military career ==
Vowles was allocated to the 9th Battery of the 1st Division at Gallipoli, directing naval guns during the landing at Anzac Cove. Following the evacuation of Gallipoli, Vowles returned to Egypt where he was transferred to the 5th Division and in June 1916 saw action in the Battle of Fromelles. In 1916 Vowles was described as and "... officer [who] knows his work, is cool and collected under fire" by his commanding officer. In August 1917 he took command of 54 Battery of the 5th Division.

Major Vowels was wounded in December 1917, by gassing, and evacuated to England. From late 1918 to February 1919 Vowles served with the Royal Horse Artillery in Palestine.

Following the armistice, Vowels was an instructor in artillery at RMC Duntroon until February 1920. He attended the Staff College, Camberley, in England during 1926–27. He was transferred from Keswick, Adelaide, to Brisbane in July 1938. Lieutenant Colonel Vowels was next appointed as General Staff Officer of the 11th Mixed Brigade in charge of training operations in Queensland. He became Director of Military Art and second in command at RMC Duntroon in February 1939, and was promoted to colonel in March 1940.

Vowles was appointed commandant of the 6th Military District in January 1942. He was re-appointed temporary brigadier in July. During 1943–44 he commanded the 12th Australian Infantry Brigade, and two base areas in New Guinea.

In March 1945 Vowles became commandant RMC Duntroon, which included the Army School of Civil Affairs, a position he held until his retirement in 1949. Vowles took the RMC from two-year courses to three-year courses to four-year courses, seeking to educate officers to a university degree standard. There was some public concern that RMC Duntroon was not sufficiently up-to-date, but Vowles was considered to be "fully seized with the vital importance of keeping Duntroon's progress well abreast of modern trends". Vowles espoused broader scientific training for atomic warfare for Australian Army officers, and lobbied for a dedicated library building, the lack of which was impeding the library's growth, and for improved dental services.

== Awards and recognition ==
- Military Cross on the Somme
- Silver Medal of Military Valor (Italian)
- Twice Mentioned in despatches
- King George VI Coronation Medal (1937)
