= Cornelian Bay Cemetery =

Public cemetery in Tasmania, Australia

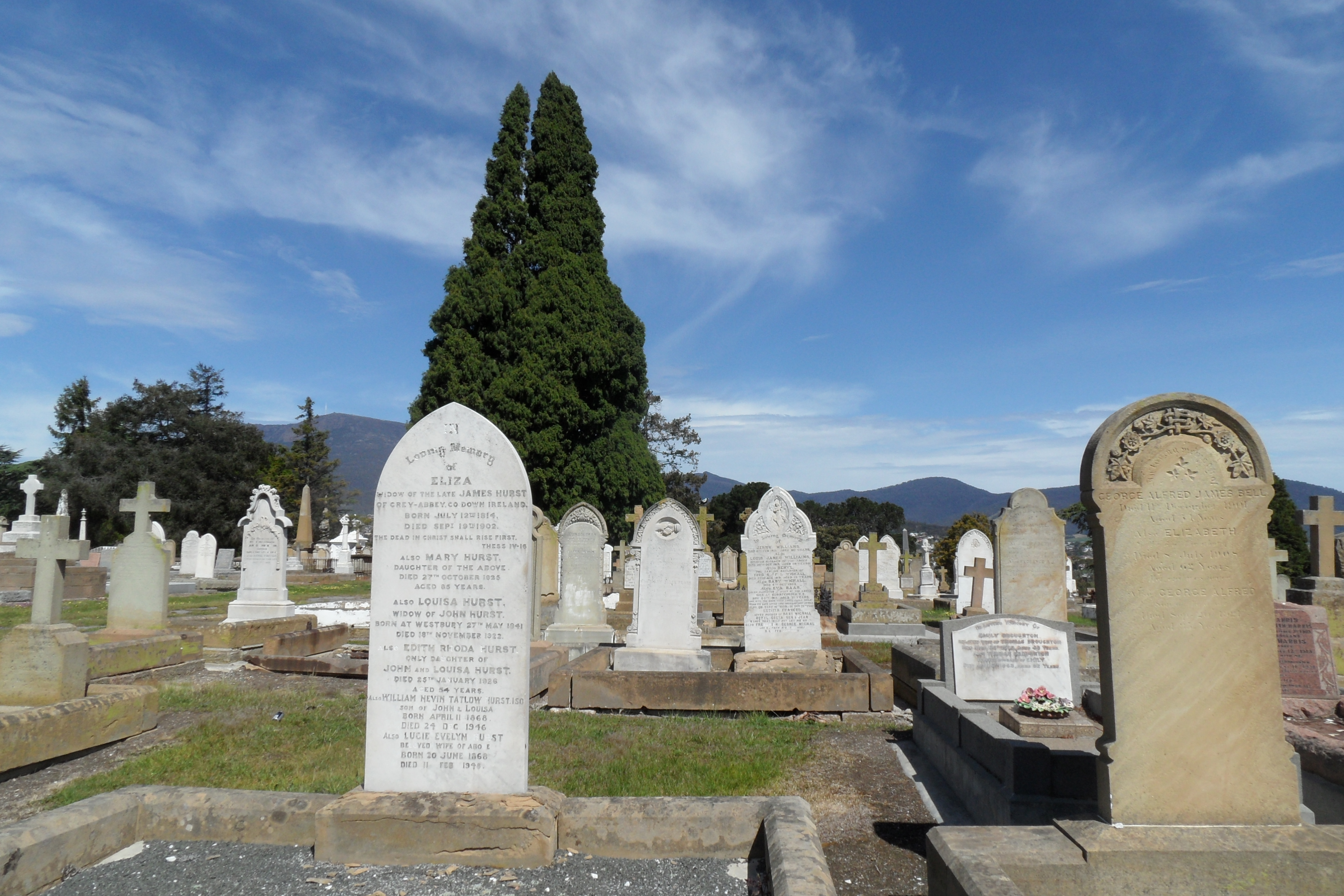
- Cornelian Bay Cemetery with Mt Wellington in the background
- Interactive map of Cornelian Bay Cemetery

Details
- Established: 1872
- Location: Cornelian Bay, Tasmania
- Country: Australia
- Coordinates: 42°50′57″S 147°19′19″E
- Website: Official website
- Find a Grave: Cornelian Bay Cemetery

Cornelian Bay Cemetery is a cemetery in Cornelian Bay, Tasmania, Australia. It is the oldest cemetery in Tasmania that remains in use.

== History ==
The cemetery location, a section of the former Government Farm site, was selected in the late 1860s, amidst concern about risks to health posed by several cemeteries close to the centre of the city of Hobart. These issues led to legislation in 1870 to close those cemeteries three months after a new cemetery could be opened, and funding for the cemetery's establishment was allocated the same year. The cemetery layout was designed by surveyor E. J. Burgess, who won a design competition for the task. It was formally opened by Governor Charles Du Cane on 22 July 1872. As some of the older cemeteries were cleared, the remains of those interred there were reburied at Cornelian Bay.

A crematorium (the Derwent Chapel) opened in 1935. It was replaced with a new facility (the Wellington Chapel) in 1993.

The cemetery was closed for new burials in 1983 when the Kingston Cemetery opened, but was reopened in 1996, with re-surveying in the 1990s identifying more potential burial plots.

== Layout and buildings ==
The cemetery features sections for various Christian denominations, a Jewish section, as well as sections for war graves, a veterans' garden of remembrance, crematorium gardens, and a garden crypts section. The ceremony had a paupers' section with unmarked graves until its closure in 1935; a memorial plaque for those buried there was placed in 1998.

The cemetery features a number of historic buildings, including the former Jewish Receiving House, cemetery superintendent's house, a shelter dating from 1873 and a blacksmith's shop dating from the former Government Farm.

== Management ==
It was variously managed by the Hobart Cemetery Trust (until 1961), Hobart City Council (1961–1982) and the Southern Regional Cemetery Trust (1982–2008). The cemetery was privatised by the Lennon Labor government in 2008, which leased it to funeral company Millingtons for fifty years. This reportedly followed the former trust running at a deficit in 2006-07.

In March 2021, The Mercury reported concerns regarding poor maintenance of graves at the cemetery.

== Notable interments ==
- Sir Ernest Clark, 15th Governor of Tasmania
- Sir Robert Cosgrove, Premier of Tasmania
- John James Dwyer VC
- Sir John William Evans, Premier of Tasmania
- John Vincent Holland VC
- William Nevin Tatlow Hurst, Secretary for Lands (1925–1938)
- Sir John Cameron McPhee, 27th Premier of Tasmania
- Lily Poulett-Harris, sportswoman
- Percy Clyde Statton VC

== War graves ==
The cemetery contains 124 Commonwealth war graves of service personnel, 49 from World War I and 75 from World War II; 42 of the graves are in a plot known as the Hobart War Cemetery, the remainder scattered throughout the cemetery. The Commonwealth War Graves Commission also erected a memorial to 18 Australian service personnel – 16 soldiers, one sailor and one airman – who were cremated at the Crematorium in the latter war, as well as the Tasmania Cremation Memorial, to four service personnel whose ashes were scattered elsewhere in Tasmania.
