= Lewis McGee (soldier) =

Australian Victoria Cross recipient

Lewis McGee VC
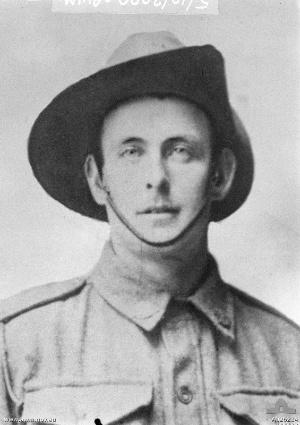
- Lewis McGee
- Born: 13 May 1888; Campbell Town, Tasmania, Australia
- Died: 12 October 1917 (aged 29); Passchendaele salient, Belgium
- Burial place: Tyne Cot Cemetery
- Military career
- Allegiance: Australia
- Branch: Australian Imperial Force
- Service years: 1916–17
- Rank: Sergeant
- Units: 40th Battalion
- Conflicts: First World War; Western Front; Battle of Messines; Battle of Passchendaele; Battle of Broodseinde; First Battle of Passchendaele †
- Awards: Victoria Cross

Lewis McGee, VC (13 May 1888 – 12 October 1917) was an Australian recipient of the Victoria Cross, the highest decoration for gallantry "in the face of the enemy" that can be awarded to members of the British and Commonwealth armed forces. As a sergeant in the Australian Imperial Force, McGee was awarded the Victoria Cross for his actions in the Battle of Broodseinde—part of the Passchendaele offensive—on 4 October 1917. As his platoon came under heavy machine gun fire from a German pillbox, McGee rushed alone across open ground towards the emplacement. Armed solely with a revolver, he shot the gunners and captured the garrison. He then organised a bombing party, and led the group in the seizure of a second machine gun post.

Born in Tasmania, McGee gained employment as an engine driver with the Tasmanian Department of Railways. In March 1916, he enlisted in the Australian Imperial Force for service in the First World War. He was posted to the 40th Battalion, and completed training in Tasmania and the United Kingdom, where he was promoted to lance corporal. Transferring to the Western Front in November 1916, McGee was rapidly promoted to corporal then sergeant, and took part in the Battle of Messines. He was killed in action on 12 October 1917 during the First Battle of Passchendaele, eight days after his Victoria Cross exploit.

== Early life ==
McGee was born in Campbell Town, Tasmania, on 13 May 1888, the youngest of eleven children to John McGee, a labourer and farmer, and his wife Mary (née Green). Three of McGee's sisters had died in infancy prior to his birth, and—when Lewis was aged only seven—his mother succumbed to pleurisy. Following his wife's death, John relocated his remaining family to a new farming property near Avoca. Here, Lewis gained employment as an engine driver with the Tasmanian Department of Railways. He also achieved a reputation as a "powerful athlete", particularly as a cyclist with the Avoca Cycling Club. On 15 November 1914, McGee married Eileen Rose Bailey; the couple had daughter called Nada the following year.

== First World War ==
On 1 March 1916, McGee enlisted in the Australian Imperial Force for service during the First World War. Allotted to the 40th Battalion as a private, he was initially posted for training at Claremont military camp with his unit for a period of three months. He was advanced to lance corporal on 22 May. On finalising its primary training, the 40th Battalion embarked for the United Kingdom on 1 July, with McGee aboard HMAT Berrima. Arriving seven weeks later, the battalion was dispatched to Salisbury Plain to complete an additional period of training in preparation of its deployment to the Western Front.

McGee proceeded to France, and the Western Front, with his battalion on 23 November 1916, arriving the next day. The unit was ultimately posted to Armentières, where McGee was raised to corporal on 4 December. Five days after his promotion, the 40th Battalion was moved into the frontline, occupying a set of trenches just south of Lys. Over subsequent engagements, McGee gained a reputation as a "natural soldier", which consequently led to his promotion to sergeant on 12 January 1917. The 40th Battalion undertook various small-scale operations and raids throughout this period until June, when it fought in the Battle of Messines. This was followed by a period in reserve behind the lines, before the battalion was shipped to Belgium in preparation for its service in the Passchendaele offensive.

=== Victoria Cross ===
As part of the third phase of the Passchendaele offensive, the 10th Australian Brigade—of which McGee's 40th Battalion was part—was detailed to execute an attack on Broodseinde Ridge. The brigade was allocated four primary objectives to seize during the assault, one for each battalion, with the 40th Battalion to take the final target located on the ridge itself. The advance commenced at the predetermined time of 06:00 on 4 October 1917, under the cover of an artillery barrage. The first three battalions were able to seize their objectives, though the fighting intensified with each stage. As the 40th Battalion set to advance towards the final objective, its progress became hampered by increasingly heavy machine-gun and rifle fire, as well as by barbed wire entanglements and sectors of impassable swamp.

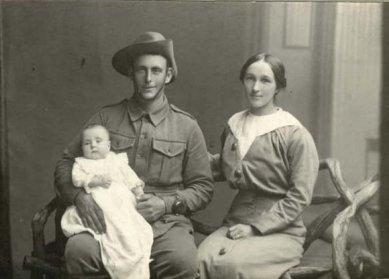
Lewis McGee with his wife Eileen and baby daughter Nada in 1916.

With McGee's B Company heading the 40th Battalion's advance, the unit was able to progress to a point approximately 270 metres (300 yd) in front of the crest, where it was confronted by a thick line of barbed wire and another bog, while simultaneously subject to the fire of ten machine guns in trenches and heavily defended pillboxes. The men of B Company struggled to within 90 metres (98 yd) of the battalion's objective, when the severe fire of the German machine guns pinned them down in shellholes.

McGee's platoon was suffering heavy casualties from a particular machine gun 50 metres (55 yd) in front of his position, which was set in a recess atop a concrete pillbox and firing directly at his men. Armed solely with a revolver, McGee dashed alone towards the post across the fire-swept ground. Shooting the gunners, he captured the remaining soldiers in the garrison as prisoners and seized control of the pillbox. On returning to his unit, he reorganised his men and led a bombing party in the capture of a second machine-gun post. McGee's actions reignited the 40th Battalion's advance, with McGee himself "foremost in the remainder" of the action. By 09:12 on 5 October, the 40th Battalion had seized its objective and held complete control of the Broodseinde Ridge, having captured 300 Germans as prisoners in the process.

As a result of his actions at Broodseinde, McGee was awarded the Victoria Cross, one of two Australians to be so decorated that day. However, he never saw the announcement of the award. On 12 October 1917—eight days after McGee's Victoria Cross action—the 40th Battalion returned to the frontline, in an attempt to exploit the success of the previous week. The battlefield was drenched in rain, turning the ground into a quagmire that was additionally dominated by several German pillboxes. McGee—who had been appointed acting company sergeant major of B Company that morning—led his unit into the attack. As the men of the company advanced forward, a machine gun began firing upon them from the front, before a second opened up on their flank. Men ran to take cover in shellholes as the German fire inflicted several casualties. McGee, however, made a rush towards the guns in an apparent effort to silence them. As he ran towards the pillbox, a bullet struck him in the head, killing him instantly. McGee was later buried in Tyne Cot Cemetery; he was one of 248 members of the 40th Battalion killed or wounded during the Battle of Passchendaele. McGee's fellow Australian Victoria Cross recipient from Broodseinde, Lance Corporal Walter Peeler, was also severely wounded on this day, receiving a bullet wound to his arm.

== Legacy ==
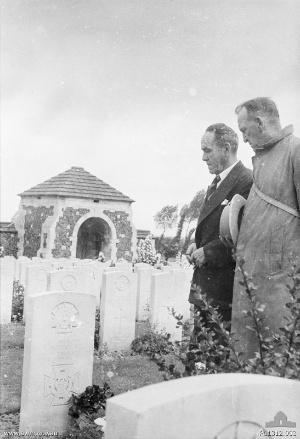
Joseph Maxwell (left) and John Patrick Hamilton (right) visit the grave of fellow Australian Victoria Cross recipient Lewis McGee in Passchendaele, Belgium c. 1956.

The announcement and accompanying citation for McGee's Victoria Cross was promulgated in a supplement to The London Gazette on 26 November 1917, reading:

War Office, 26th November, 1917.

His Majesty the KING has been graciously pleased to approve of the award of the Victoria Cross to the undermentioned Officer, Non-commissioned Officers and Men: —

No. 456 Sjt. Lewis McGee, late Aus. Imp. Force.

For most conspicuous bravery when in the advance to the final objective, Sjt. McGee led his platoon with great dash and bravery, though strongly opposed, and under heavy shell fire.

His platoon was suffering severely and the advance of the Company was stopped by machine gun fire from a "Pill-box" post. Single-handed Sjt. McGee rushed the post armed only with a revolver. He shot some of the crew and captured the rest, and thus enabled the advance to proceed. He reorganised the remnants of his platoon and was foremost in the remainder of the advance, and during consolidation of the position he did splendid work.

This Non-commissioned Officer's coolness and bravery were conspicuous and contributed largely to the success of the Company's operations.

Sjt. McGee was subsequently killed in action.

McGee's wife, Eileen, was presented with her late husband's Victoria Cross by the Governor-General of Australia, Sir Ronald Munro Ferguson, at an investiture ceremony in Launceston's York Park during October 1918. Additionally, Eileen McGee was later gifted an Iron Cross that her husband had captured from a German officer at Broodseinde, which was enclosed in a letter of condolence written to her by an officer of the 40th Battalion.

Prior to his Victoria Cross action, McGee had been noted in the 40th Battalion for his leadership qualities, and had attained a "famous fighting record". In addition to his decoration, McGee had been recommended for a commission as a result of his actions at Broodseinde, with an officer in his battalion declaring "had he lived his commission would have been assured". His original company commander, Major Leslie Payne, noted McGee's "sterling qualities as a leader" and stated: "His ability in the carrying out of certain important tasks early in the year was most marked and ... there is in my opinion, and the opinion of many others, no more gallant and capable non-commissioned officer in the battalion."

McGee is commemorated on a war cenotaph located in Ross, Tasmania, and his name was given to the McGee Soldiers' Club at Anglesea Army Barracks, Tasmania, which was opened in 1956. During the 150th anniversary celebrations of the town of Avoca in March 1984, the Governor of Tasmania, Sir James Plimsoll, unveiled a memorial plaque on the Returned Serviceman's League cenotaph honouring McGee; his widow and their daughter attended the ceremony. McGee's Victoria Cross and other medals are held in the collections of the Queen Victoria Museum and Art Gallery, Tasmania.
