= 7th Military District =

Administrative district of the Australian Army

Coordinates: 12.4574°S 130.8235°E

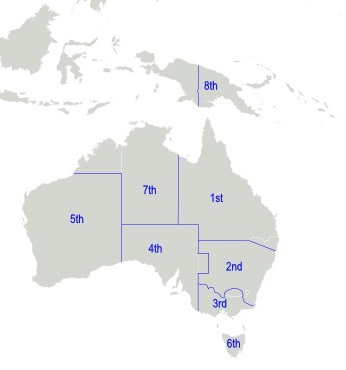
Australian military districts, October 1939

The 7th Military District (7MD) was an administrative district of the Australian Army. During the Second World War, the 7th Military District covered all of the Northern Territory, with its headquarters at Darwin.

Between 1939 and 1942, 7MD also included the Kimberley region of Western Australia (which thereafter reverted to the 5th Military District).

In 1942, the district was temporarily inactivated and control of ground forces in the NT fell under Northern Territory Force. 7 MD was reinstated following the end of World War II, on 28 February 1946.
