= Timor Force =

Timor Force was an Australian Army detachment during the Second World War. The force accepted the surrender of the Imperial Japanese forces in Timor from the commander of the 48th Division of the Imperial Japanese Army at Koepang on 3 October 1945.

The force was raised from the 12th Brigade, which had formed part of Northern Territory Force during the war.
