= Northern Territory Force =

2018-2019 formation of the Australian Army

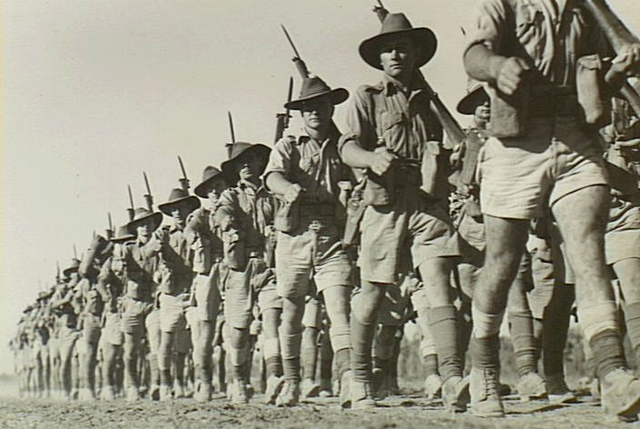
- Australian infantry at Darwin in August 1942
- Active: 1942–1946
- Country: Australia
- Role: Area defence
- Size: 1–3 brigades
- Garrison/HQ: Darwin, Northern Territory

Commanders
- Notable commanders: Edmund Herring; Jack Stevens

Insignia
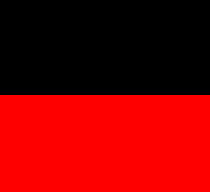
- Unit colour patch

Northern Territory Force was an Australian Army force responsible for protecting the Northern Territory during World War II. Most units assigned to the Northern Territory Force were based near Darwin and were responsible for defending the important naval and air bases in and around the town against a feared Japanese invasion. Northern Territory Force was renamed the 12th Division in late 1942 but this was short-lived. Australian Army units were rotated through northern Australia during the war and six infantry brigades served as part of Northern Territory Force between 1942 and 1945. The formation was reduced over the course of the war as the strategic situation in the Pacific turned in the Allies' favour, although remnants remained until the end of the war. In early 1946, it was converted back to the 7th Military District.

== History ==
In mid-1942, the strategic situation in the Pacific was desperate for the Allies with the Fall of Singapore in February 1942 and the Japanese victory in the Dutch East Indies campaign. Amidst concerns about the security of the Australian mainland, the Australian government decided to bolster the defences around Darwin and to reorganise them. The Northern Territory Force was established on 25 April 1942 from the headquarters of the 6th Division and 7th Military District, with the previous headquarters troops being transferred to control the district's line of communications. Its first commander was Major General Edmund Herring, who arrived at a time when an invasion was expected and comprehensive changes to tactical dispositions were delayed. Herring did redeploy some of the defending elements, most of which were Militia formations that had been mobilised for wartime duties. The 19th Battalion and the 3rd Brigade were pulled back from the beaches and established stronger defended positions in depth. The 23rd Brigade was moved north to establish a counter-attacking force.

As the threat passed, at the end of April, Herring reorganised his force extending the fortress area to include RAAF Base Darwin and strengthening its defences. To defend the vital supply lines that stretched towards Alice Springs and Mount Isa, screening forces from the 3rd and 23rd Brigades were deployed to two locations well south of Darwin, poised to deploy forward in the event of an invasion. In May, the 19th Brigade, a veteran Second Australian Imperial Force unit, arrived from Adelaide and a third brigade area was established. Headquarters elements were established at 56-Mile and Adelaide River. The 2/4th Independent Company was assigned patrolling duties around Katherine and the 2/6th Cavalry Regiment occupied Pine Creek. The 2/4th Independent Company was relieved by the establishment of the 2/1st North Australia Observer Unit in August 1942, releasing the 2/4th to be deployed to Timor to reinforce the 2/2nd Independent Company.

Northern Territory Force was renamed the 12th Division on 31 December 1942 and reverted to the title of Northern Territory Force on 15 January 1943. During the fifteen days that the formation constituted the 12th Division, it comprised the 3rd Brigade, 19th Brigade, 23rd Brigade, 2/4th Pioneer Battalion and 2/6th Cavalry Regiment.

When the 3rd Brigade was transferred to the 4th Division and moved to Townsville, Queensland, the 13th Brigade took its place, being transferred from Western Australia. The 19th Brigade was returned to the 6th Division, rejoining them on the Atherton Tablelands in June 1943 and their place was taken by the 12th Brigade from Tasmania. In July 1943, defence plans were revised and the area that the garrison was expected to cover was concentrated around Darwin rather than its hinterland. The 23rd Brigade was redeployed to the Atherton Tablelands for training, ahead of its employment in combat operations as part of the 3rd Division. The 2nd Brigade subsequently took the place of the 23rd Brigade in the garrison, being transferred from Perth.

In mid-1944, the defence plans relating to the Darwin region was revised again. The threat of invasion had passed and a manpower shortage had developed within the Army and the Australian economy. The garrison was reduced to a single brigade: the 12th. The 13th Brigade was reorganised and prepared for combat operations in the Pacific, eventually to take part in the fighting on New Britain. The 2nd Brigade was chosen for disbandment and its personnel were transferred to several understrength units. The force's headquarters elements were consolidated in October 1944 and established themselves at Larrakeyah Barracks. The 12th Brigade continued defensive duties around Darwin until the end of the war in August 1945, when it was finally deployed as part of Timor Force. Following this, the size of the force was slowly reduced as part of the demobilisation process and the majority of its units were supply, transport, maintenance, medical, signals and engineer units spread across Darwin, Alice Springs and Mount Isa, although there was a small artillery element based around Darwin's fixed defences. The force's headquarters remained until 28 February 1946 when it was converted back into the 7th Military District.

== Subordinate units ==
The main units deployed to protect Darwin during the war were:

- 2nd Brigade (September 1943 – September 1944)
- 3rd Brigade (March 1942 – March 1943)
- 12th Brigade (July 1943 – end of war)
- 13th Brigade (March 1943 – November 1944)
- 19th Brigade (March 1942 – June 1943)
- 23rd Brigade (March 1941 – September 1943)
- Darwin Fortress Company, RAE (December 1941 – December 1944)
- 2/4th Pioneer Battalion (15 December 1942 – 15 October 1944)
- 2/6th Cavalry Regiment (15 December 1942 – 15 December 1943)

== Commanding officers ==
The following officers commanded the formation during the war:

- Major General Edmund Herring (April–August 1942)
- Major General Jack Stevens (August 1942 – March 1943)
- Major General Arthur Samuel Allen (March 1943 – October 1944)
- Brigadier Robert Harold Nimmo (acting; October 1944 – January 1945)
- Major General John Murray (March 1945 – January 1946)
