= British Expeditionary Force (World War I) =

Six army divisions on the Western Front

- Active: 1914–1918
- Country: United Kingdom of Great Britain and Ireland
- Allegiance: George V
- Branch: British Army
- Type: Army
- Size: 247,400 (1914–1915); Peak strength 2.04 million Total employed 5.4 million (1916–1918)
- Nickname: BEF
- Engagements: See below

Commanders
- Commander-in-chief (1915–1918): Field Marshal Douglas Haig
- Commander-in-chief (1914–1915): Field Marshal John French

- Principal battles of the British Expeditionary Force
- 1914; Battle of Mons; Battle of Le Cateau; First Battle of the Marne; First Battle of the Aisne; Battle of La Bassée; First Battle of Ypres; 1915; Battle of Neuve Chapelle; Second Battle of Ypres; Battle of Festubert; Battle of Loos; 1916; Battle of the Somme; Attack at Fromelles; 1917; Battle of Arras; Battle of the Messines; Third Battle of Ypres; First Battle of Cambrai; 1918; First Battle of the Somme (1918); Battle of the Lys; Second Battle of the Aisne; Second battle of the Marne; Hundred Days' Offensive; Battle of Amiens; Second Battle of the Somme (1918); Battle of Épehy; Second Battle of Cambrai; Battle of Sambre

The British Expeditionary Force (BEF) was the formation of the British Army on the Western Front during the First World War. In its original form it comprised six divisions, sent by Britain to France in 1914 to aid in resisting the German invasion.

Planning for a British Expeditionary Force began with the 1906–1912 Haldane Reforms of the British Army carried out by the Secretary of State for War Richard Haldane following the Second Boer War (1899–1902).

The designation "British Expeditionary Force" remained the official name of the British armies in France and Flanders throughout the First World War; but in general usage the term often refers only to the forces present in France during 1914, up to the end of the First Battle of Ypres (22 November) or to 26 December, when the BEF was divided into the First and Second Armies. (A Third, Fourth and Fifth were created later in the war). During that year the BEF helped stop the German advance, but by the year's end – after the battles of Mons, Le Cateau, First Aisne and First Ypres – the then BEF had been almost exhausted.

Emperor Wilhelm II of Germany, who was famously dismissive of the BEF, was widely said in Britain to have issued an order on 19 August 1914 to "exterminate ... the treacherous English and walk over General French's contemptible little army". Hence, in later years, the survivors of the 1914 army dubbed themselves "The Old Contemptibles". No evidence of any such order being issued by the Kaiser has ever been found.

== Formation ==
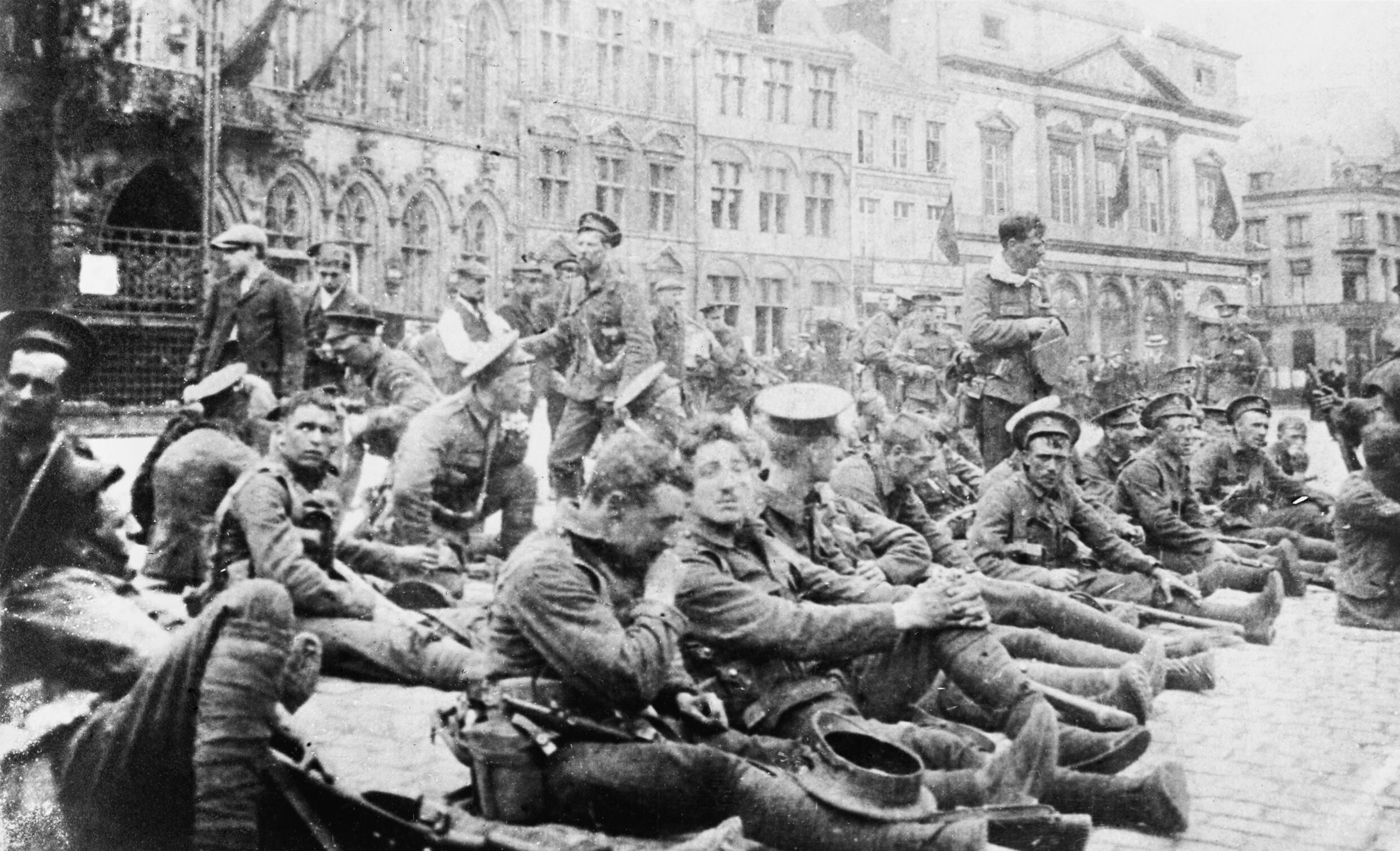
Tommies of the 4th Battalion, Royal Fusiliers (City of London Regiment) resting in the square at Mons 22 August 1914, the day before the Battle of Mons.

Under the terms of the Entente Cordiale the United Kingdom had a diplomatic "understanding" with France to counter military aggression from the German Empire in the European continent. Detailed plans had been made for the British Army in the event of war breaking out between those two countries to dispatch an Expeditionary Force to France which consisted of six infantry divisions and five cavalry brigades under the command of General Sir John French to repel any German attack in the West. The BEF was arranged into I Corps, under the command of General Sir Douglas Haig, and II Corps, under the command of General Sir James Grierson, which embarked for France on 15 August 1914. The Expeditionary Force was given the prefix "British" on the arrival of Expeditionary Force A from the Indian Army.

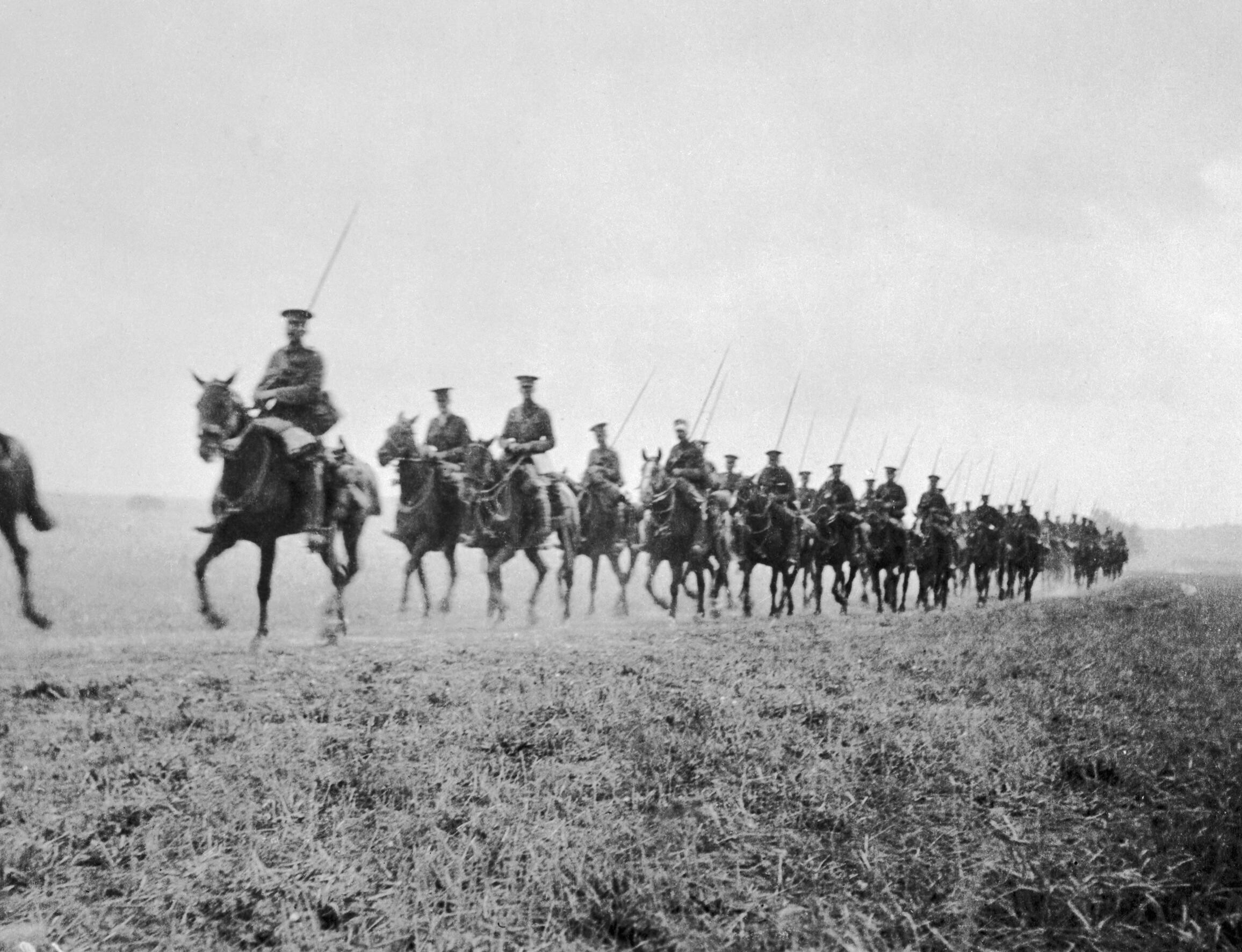
Men and horses of the Cavalry Division, British Expeditionary Force, retreat from Mons in August 1914.

In October 1914, 7th Division arrived in France, forming the basis of III Corps and the cavalry had grown to form the Cavalry Corps of three divisions. By December 1914, the BEF had expanded to such an extent that the First Army and the Second Army were formed.

By the end of 1914, after the battles of Mons, Le Cateau, the Aisne and Ypres, the old regular British Army had suffered massive casualties and lost most of its fighting strength but had managed to help stop the German advance.

=== Command structure ===
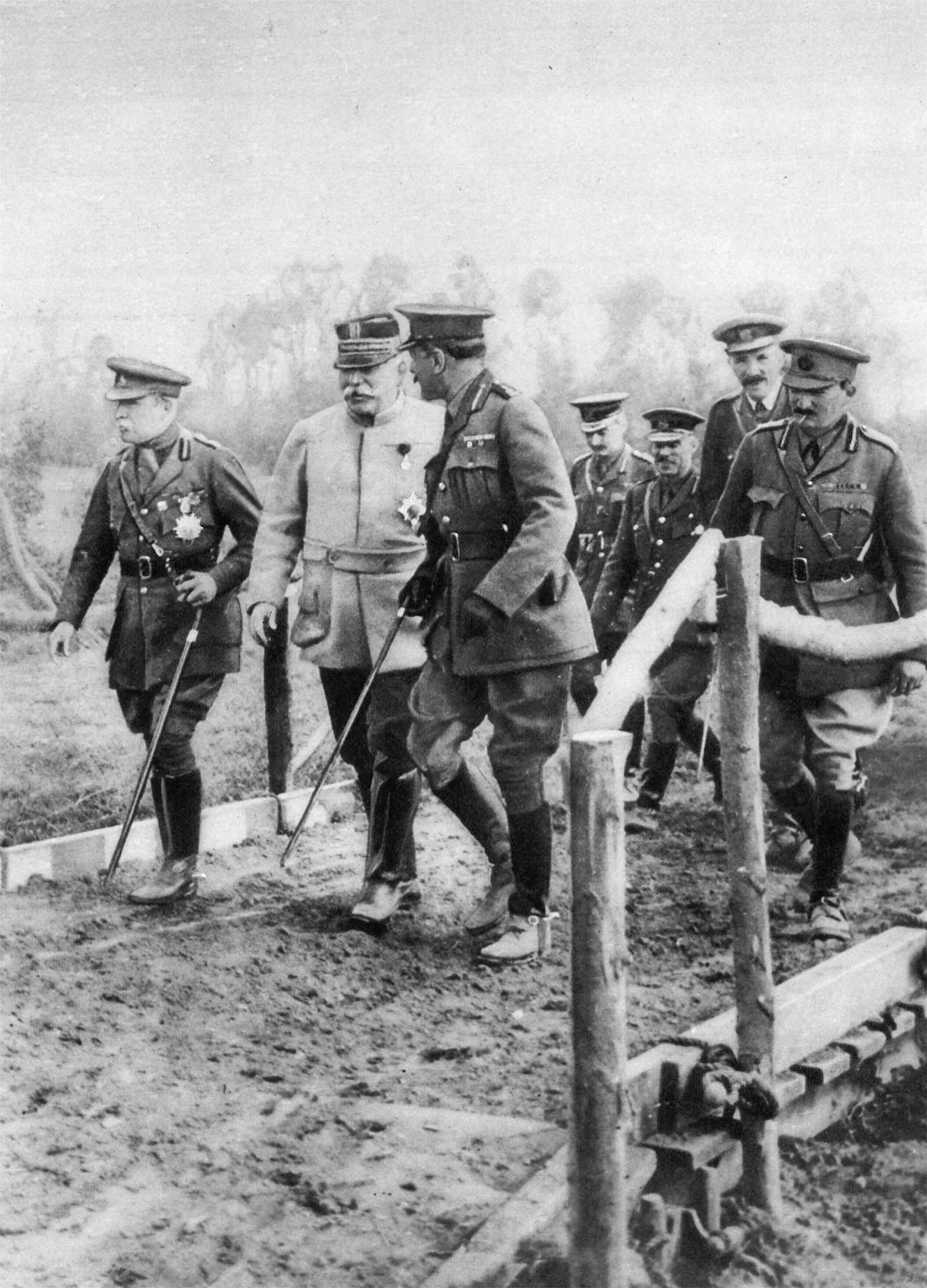
left to right, generals John French, Joseph Joffre and Douglas Haig behind the front. Lt-General Henry Wilson is second from right.

The force was commanded by Field Marshal Sir John French until December 1915, when he was replaced by General Sir Douglas Haig. The BEF's Chief of Staff on mobilisation was General Archibald Murray. He was replaced in January 1915 by General William Robertson. Lieutenant-General Launcelot Kiggell then served as Chief of Staff from December 1915 to January 1917 when he was succeeded by Lieutenant-General Herbert Lawrence. The first two Corps were commanded by Haig (I Corps) and Horace Smith-Dorrien (II Corps).

=== Kitchener's New Army ===
As the Regular Army's strength declined, the numbers were made up, first by the Territorial Force, then by volunteers from Lord Kitchener's New Army. By the end of August 1914, he had raised six new divisions and by March 1915, the number of divisions had increased to 29. The Territorial Force was also expanded, raising second and third-line battalions and forming eight new divisions, which supplemented its peacetime strength of 14 divisions. The Third Army was formed in July 1915 and with the influx of troops from Kitchener's volunteers and further reorganisation, the Fourth Army and the Reserve Army, became the Fifth Army in 1916.

== Expansion ==
=== First Army ===
A British trench near the Albert-Bapaume road at Ovillers-la-Boisselle, July 1916 during the Battle of the Somme. The men are from A Company, 11th Battalion, The Cheshire Regiment

The BEF grew from six divisions of the British regular army and reserves in 1914, to encompass the British Empire's war effort on the Western front in 1918 and some of its allies. Over the course of the war 5,399,563 men served with the BEF, the peak strength being 2,046,901 men. The First Army was formed on 26 December 1914. Its first commander was Douglas Haig promoted from command of the I Corps. When Haig took over command of the BEF in 1915, the new commander was General Henry Horne. First Army remained in France until the end of the war.

=== Second Army ===
The Second Army was formed at the same time as the First Army on 26 December 1914. The first commander was Smith–Dorrien promoted from command of the II Corps. In May 1915, Smith–Dorrien was sacked and replaced by General Herbert Plumer. Second Army served in France notably in the Ypres Salient, and later served in Italy between November 1917 and March 1918, then returned to France.

=== Third Army ===
The Third Army was formed in July 1915, the first commander being General Edmund Allenby promoted after commanding the Cavalry Corps and the V Corps. He was replaced after the battle of Arras in May 1917, by General Julian Byng.

=== Fourth Army ===
The Fourth Army was formed in February 1916, under the command of General Henry Rawlinson. Confusingly, when the Second Army was sent to Italy late in 1917, the Fourth Army was renumbered the Second Army whilst Rawlinson commanded the Ypres Salient. After Plumer's return from Italy Rawlinson spent a period as British Permanent Military Representative at the Supreme War Council at Versailles, but at the start of April he took over the remnants of Hubert Gough's Fifth Army after its recent defeat. It was renamed the Fourth Army.

=== Reserve/Fifth Army ===
The Reserve Army was formed in May 1916, under command of General Hubert Gough. Beginning as the Reserve Corps, it was expanded and renamed the Reserve Army and became the Fifth Army in October 1916. Fifth Army suffered heavy losses during the German spring offensive in March 1918. It was reformed again in May 1918 under the command of General William Birdwood.

== Area of operations ==
=== 1914 ===
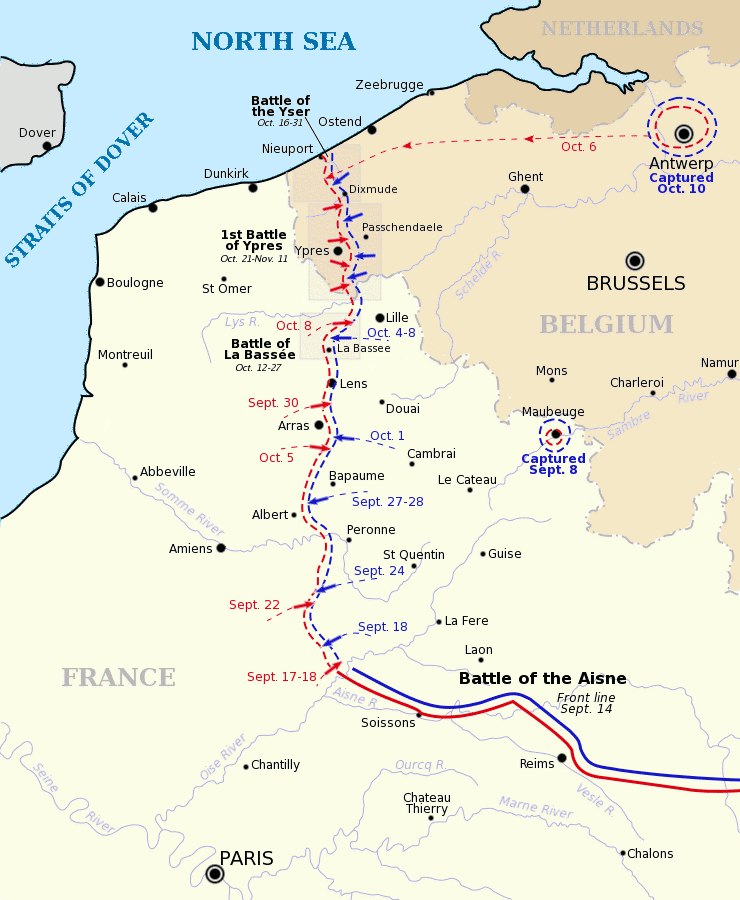
The Race to the Sea, Allied front line and movements are shown in red, German front line and movements are shown in blue

The British Army first engaged the Imperial German Army in the Battle of Mons on 23 August 1914, which was part of the greater Battle of the Frontiers. The mass rifle fire of the professional British soldiers inflicted heavy casualties on the Germans who attacked en masse over terrain devoid of cover. The British held up the German advance until the evening when they began retiring to a second defensive line in the retreat from Mons during which they were engaged in the Battle of Le Cateau. Following the battle at Le Cateau, the BEF retreated unmolested by the Germans for a further five days, eventually retreating a full 400 km in thirteen days.

The Allied retreat finally ended at the River Marne, where Entente forces prepared to make a stand to defend Paris. This led to the First Battle of the Marne, which was fought from 5 to 10 September 1914. This battle would prove to be a major turning point of the war: it denied the Germans an early victory. From 13 September the First Battle of the Aisne took place, with both sides starting to dig trenches. Then for three weeks following the development of trench warfare, each side gave up frontal assaults and began trying to encircle each other's flank. This period became known as the Race to the Sea: the Germans aimed to turn the Allied left flank, and the Allies sought to turn the German right flank.

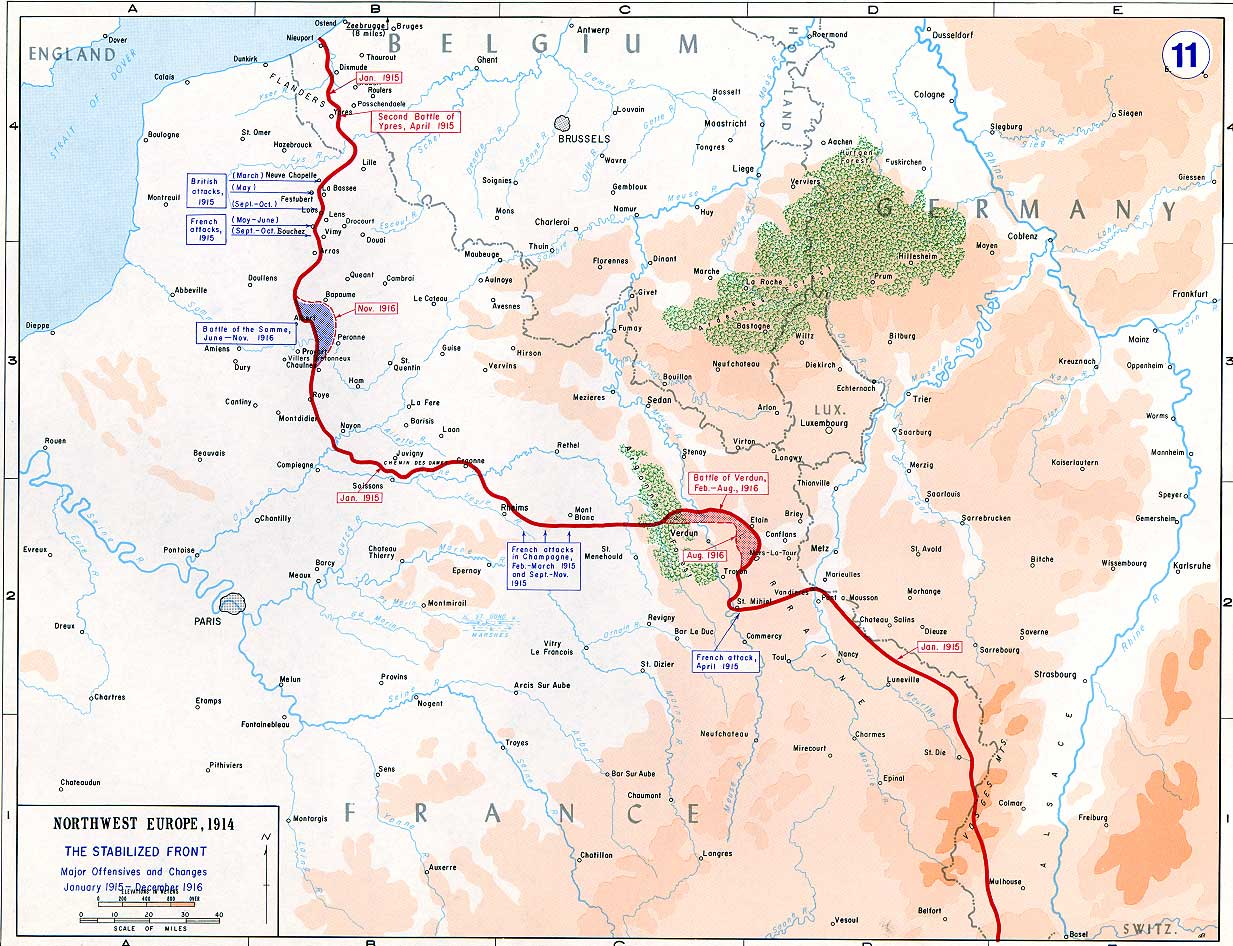
The front line in 1916, British gains during the battle of the Somme are shaded blue.

By the end of First Battle of Ypres both sides started to dig in and trench warfare replaced the manoeuvre warfare that had featured during the Race to the Sea. The continuous trench lines of the Western Front now stretched 400 miles (640 km) from the North Sea to the Swiss frontier. The British Army held a small portion of this 400 mile front: from just north of the pre-war Belgium border to the River Somme in France, varying in length from 20 miles (32 km) in 1914, to over 120 miles (190 km) in 1918, in the area commonly known as Flanders.

=== 1915 ===
From the end of 1914, and in 1915, BEF attacks centred around the Ypres Salient. Then in September 1915, six divisions took part in the Battle of Loos – notable for the first use of poison gas by the British.

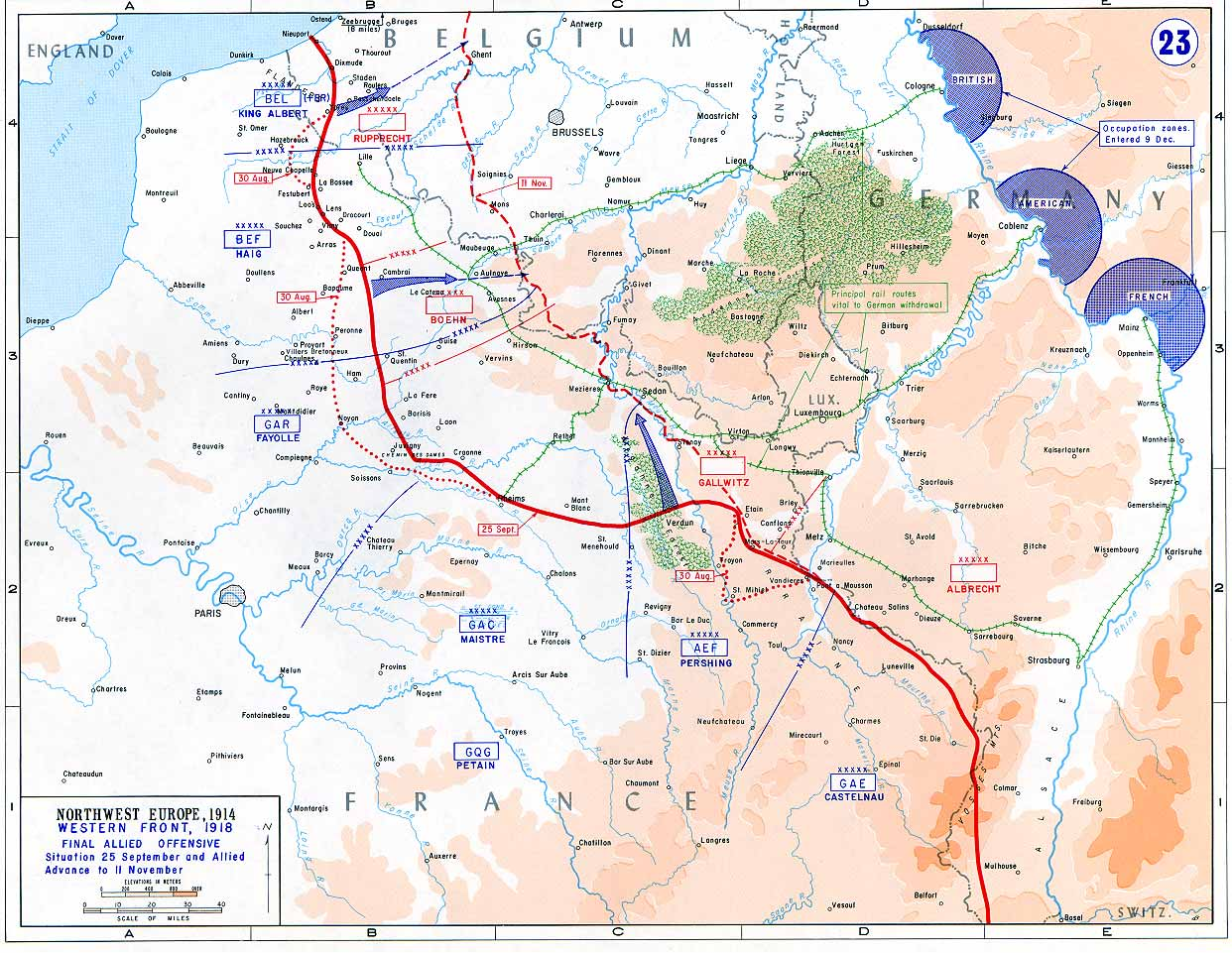
The French, British, Belgian and American lines of attack, during the Hundred Days Offensive

=== 1916 ===
In 1916 the BEF had moved into the Picardy region of France. The Battle of the Somme dominated British military activity for the year. Allied forces attempted to break through the German lines along a 25 miles (40 km) front north and south of the River Somme in northern France. On the first day on the Somme the BEF suffered 57,000 casualties. After the war a final tally counted 419,654 British and 204,253 French killed, wounded, or taken prisoner; of the 623,907 total casualties, 146,431 were either killed or missing.

=== 1917 ===
In 1917 the BEF's attacks moved along the front, they operated in the Pas-de-Calais during the Battle of Arras. They then concentrated in Belgium for the Battle of Messines and the Battle of Passchendale, and ended the year back in the Pas-de-Calais for the Battle of Cambrai.

=== 1918 ===
In the spring of 1918 the BEF came under attack both in Flanders and on the Somme during the German spring offensive. The Second Battle of the Somme represented the BEF response to the German attack. This in turn began the Hundred Days Offensive, which led to the eventual defeat of the German Army on the western front, after the First and Third armies broke through the Hindenburg Line at the Battle of the Canal du Nord. This led to the final battle of the war in November 1918, the Battle of the Sambre by the First, Third and Fourth Armies and to the capture of Mons, 11 November 1918, by the First Army.

== Empire, Indian and Portuguese contribution ==
The British Empire responded to the call for troops for the Western Front and major formations from the dominions included Canadian Army, Australian Army, New Zealand Army and the South African Army, all served in France. The BEF also integrated the British Indian Army and most of the Portuguese Army troops who fought on the Western Front.

=== Indian Expeditionary Force A ===
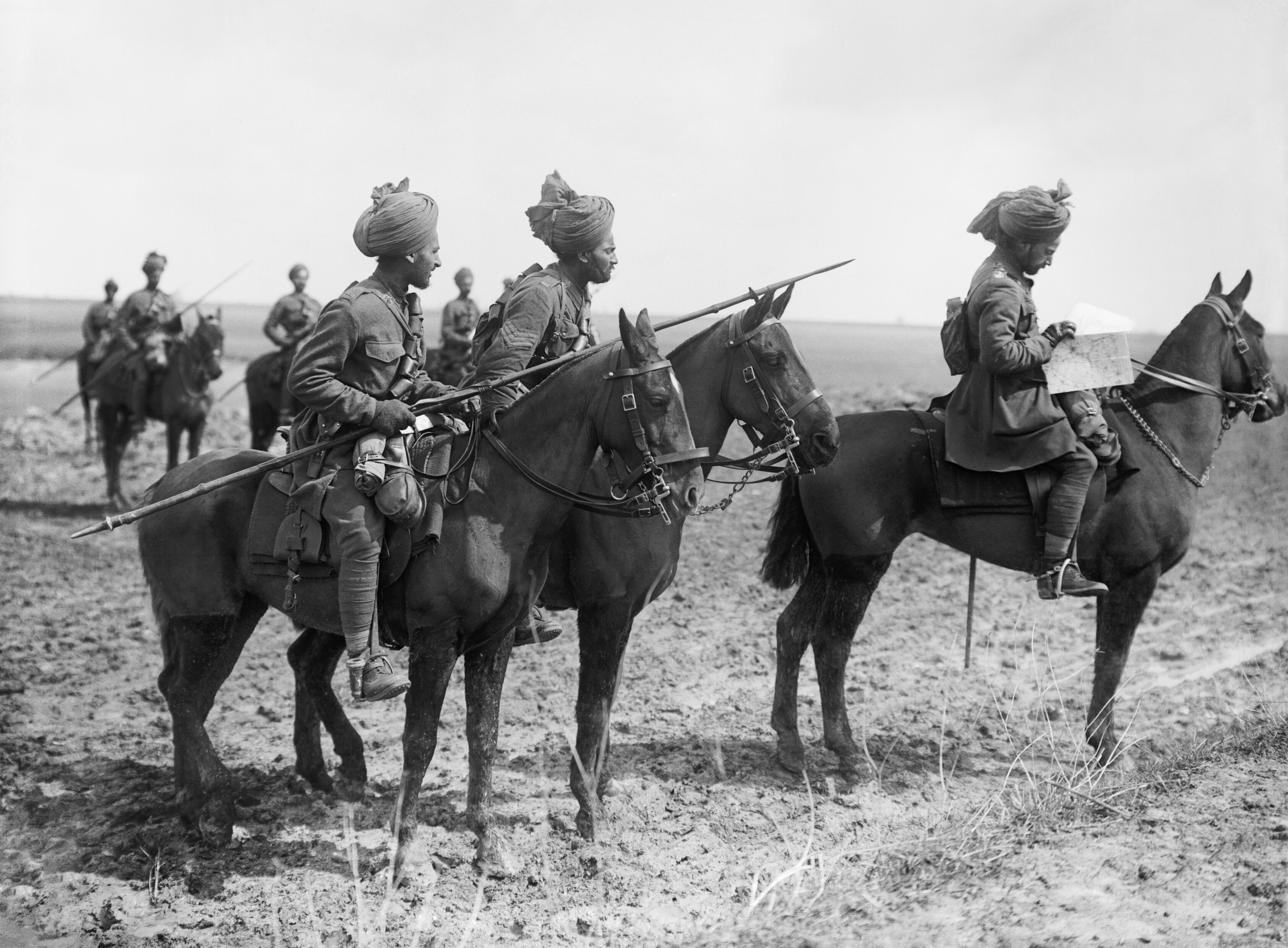
Men from an Indian Cavalry regiment on the Western front 1914

In September 1914, the BEF was reinforced by the Indian Expeditionary Force A which eventually formed two corps each of two divisions, the Indian Cavalry Corps and the Indian Infantry Corps. Upon arrival in Marseille on 30 September 1914, only six weeks after the declaration of war, they were moved to the Ypres Salient and took part in the Battle of La Bassée in October 1914. In March 1915, the 7th (Meerut) Division was chosen to lead the assault in the Battle of Neuve Chapelle.The Expeditionary Force was hampered by a lack of familiarity with new equipment, only being issued Lee–Enfield rifles on their arrival in France and they had almost no artillery, relying on support from their neighbouring corps when in the front line. They were not accustomed to the continental weather and were poorly equipped to resist the cold, leading to low morale which was further compounded by the reserve system, whereby reinforcements were drafted in from any regiment and had no affiliation to their new units. Officer casualties were even more of a handicap, as replacements were unfamiliar with the Indian Army and could not speak the language. The infantry divisions were finally withdrawn to Egypt in October 1915, when they were replaced by the new British divisions of Kitchener's Army.

=== South African Overseas Expeditionary Force ===
The South African Overseas Expeditionary Force consisted of the 1st South African Infantry Brigade of four infantry battalions supported by five Heavy Artillery batteries, a Field Ambulance, a Royal Engineers Signal Company and a General Hospital under the command of Brigadier General Henry Lukin. The brigade arrived in France in April 1916, and was assigned to the 9th (Scottish) Division and took part in the Battle of the Somme in July 1916, and on 14 July the Battle of Delville Wood. Of the 3,153 men in the brigade only 750 were left when the brigade was relieved on 20 July. Later in 1917, the brigade took part in the Battle of Arras and in the Third Battle of Ypres (Passchendaele). The brigade was destroyed in the 1918 German spring offensive and by the end of the war had suffered 15,000 casualties, with 5,000 killed.

=== Canadian Expeditionary Force ===
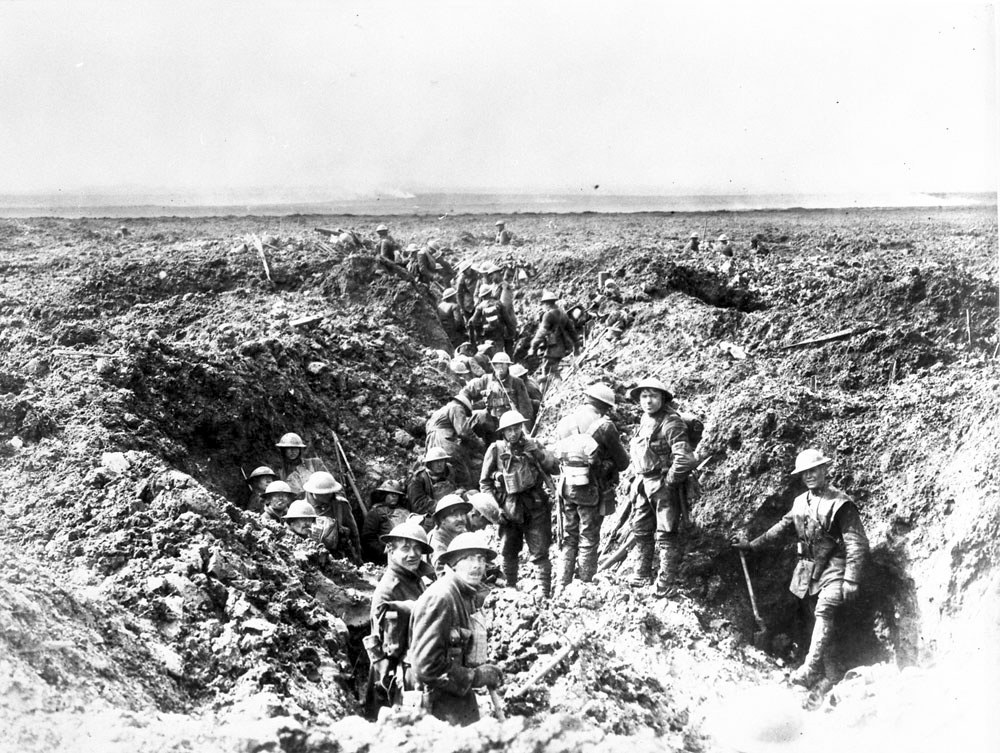
Canadian soldiers consolidating their positions on Vimy Ridge

The Canadian Expeditionary Force was the designation of the field force created by Canada for service overseas in the First World War. Its major combat formation was the Canadian Corps, which eventually commanded four Canadian infantry divisions. The Canadian Corps' first commander was General Edwin Alderson, who was succeeded by General Julian Byng in 1916, who was in turn succeeded in 1917, by the Canadian General Arthur Currie until the end of the war. They distinguished themselves in battle from the Second Battle of Ypres, through the Somme and particularly in the Battle of Arras at Vimy Ridge in April 1917. Since they were mostly untouched by the German offensive in the spring of 1918, the Canadians were ordered to help spearhead the last campaigns of the War from the Battle of Amiens in August 1918.

=== New Zealand Expeditionary Force ===
The New Zealand Expeditionary Force (NZEF) under the command of General Alexander Godley was the title of the military forces sent from New Zealand to fight for Britain during the First World War. Upon the outbreak of war, New Zealand immediately offered to provide two brigades — one of infantry and one of mounted troops — a total of 8,500 men. The NZEF was closely tied to the AIF for much of the war. When the Gallipoli campaign began, the New Zealand contingent was insufficient to complete a division on their own so was combined with the 4th Australian Infantry Brigade to form the New Zealand and Australian Division. This division, along with the Australian 1st Division, formed the famous Australian and New Zealand Army Corps (ANZAC) under the command of General William Birdwood. After the end of the Gallipoli campaign, the NZEF formed its own infantry division; the New Zealand Division which served on the Western Front from April 1916. It took part in the Battle of Flers-Courcelette, the Battle of Morval, the Battle of Le Transloy, and the celebrated Battle of Le Quesnoy. The New Zealanders were considered exceptional troops by the Germans, a captured intelligence report named them "...An exceptionally good assault division ...".

=== Australian Imperial Force ===
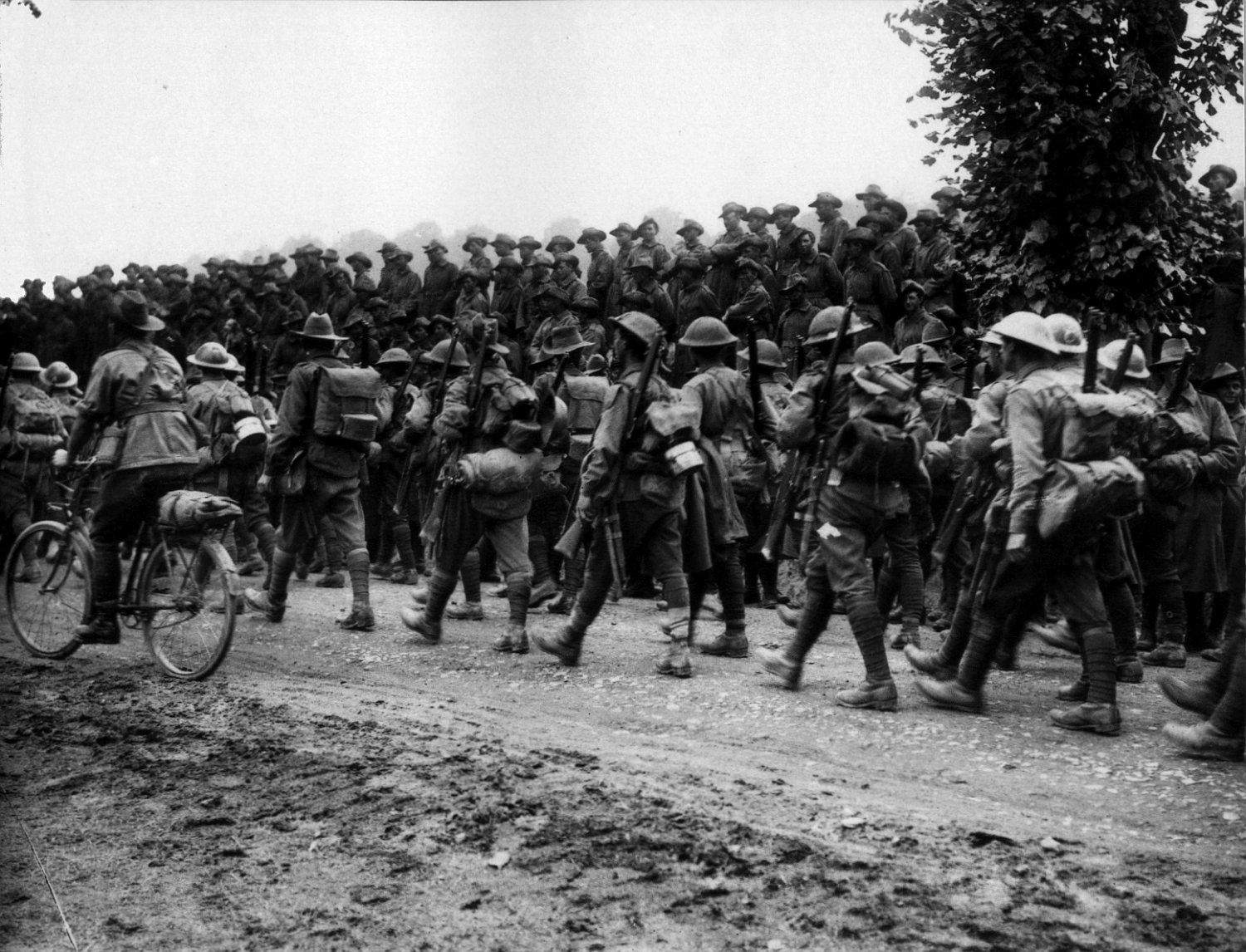
Australian 2nd Division marching to the rear after the Battle of Pozières, August 1916. They are being watched by soldiers of the Australian 1st Division

The Australian Imperial Force (AIF) was originally supposed to supply 20,000 men organised into one infantry division and one light horse brigade plus supporting units. By the end of the war, the AIF on the Western Front comprised five infantry divisions. The first Australian troops arrived in France in June 1915, the 1st Siege Artillery Brigade was formed under the command of Lieutenant Colonel Walter Adams Coxen, the Australian Army's Director of Artillery, for service on the Western Front. About half the men in the unit were permanent gunners of the Garrison Artillery. The brigade departed Melbourne for England on 17 July 1915 and landed in France on 27 February 1916. Its 54th Siege Battery was equipped with 8 inch howitzers and its 55th Siege Battery with 9.2 inch howitzers. Five infantry divisions of the AIF saw action on the Western Front in France and Belgium, leaving Egypt in March 1916. Initially they were organised into I Anzac Corps and II Anzac Corps alongside the New Zealand Division, however, on 1 November 1917 the Australian divisions were re-grouped together to form the Australian Corps. The 2nd Division was the first to arrive in France, followed by the 1st Division, while the 4th and 5th left Egypt later in June 1916. The 3rd Division was the last to arrive, having been formed in Australia in March 1916, and moving to England for training in July 1916, before being sent to France in December 1916. When originally formed in 1914 the AIF was commanded by Major General William Throsby Bridges, who also commanded the 1st Division. After Bridges' death at Gallipoli in May 1915, command transferred by default to Lieutenant General William Birdwood, a British officer who was commander of the Australian and New Zealand Army Corps. Birdwood was officially confirmed as commander of the AIF on 14 September 1916, while also commanding I Anzac Corps on the Western Front. Birdwood was later given command of the Australian Corps on formation in November 1917. Lieutenant General John Monash, an Australian officer, took over command of the corps in May 1918. Despite being promoted to command the Fifth Army, Birdwood retained command of the AIF.

=== Portuguese Expeditionary Corps ===
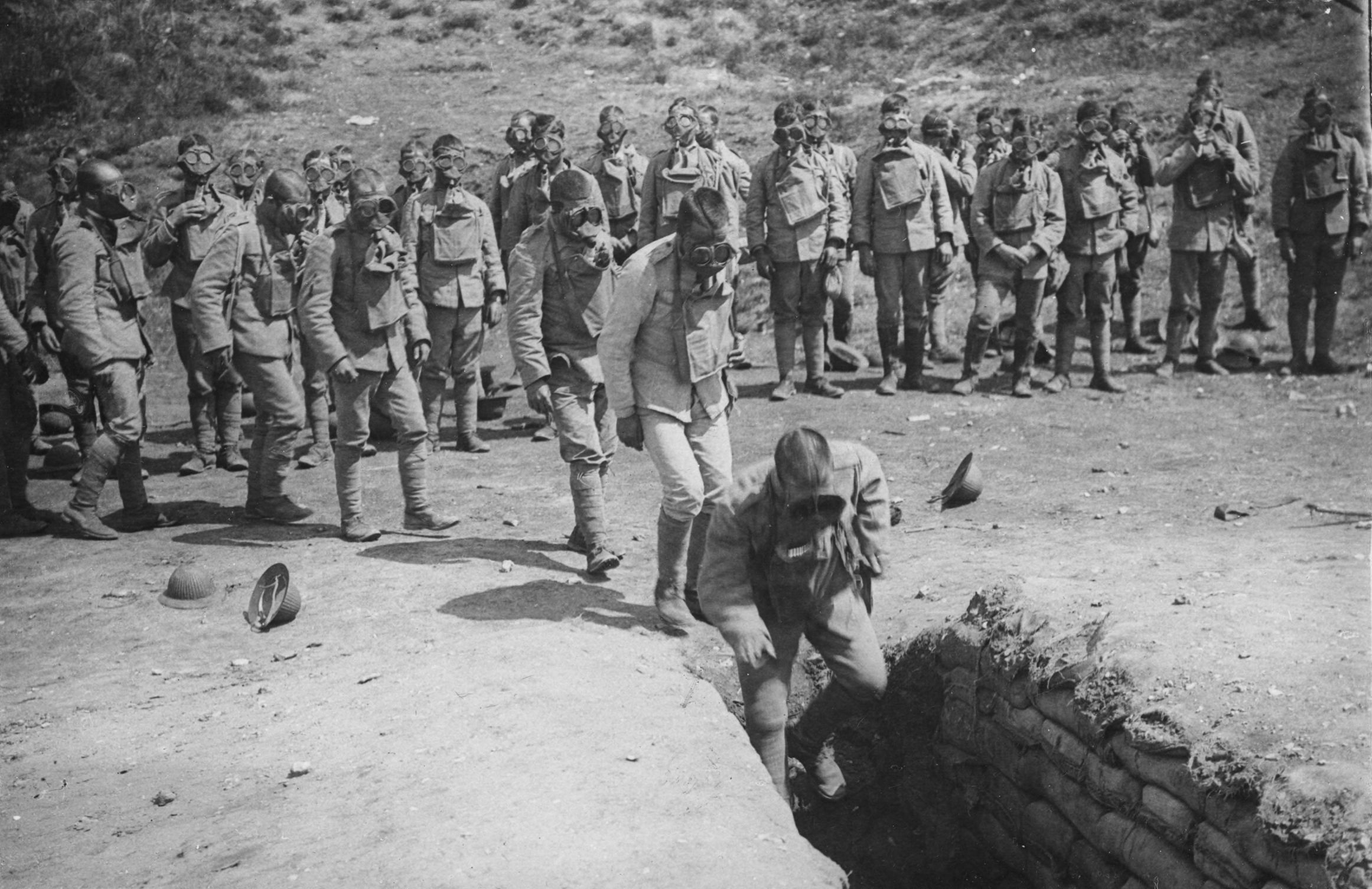
Portuguese troops training with gas masks in the Western Front.

Following a British Government call for Portuguese troops, on 7 August 1916 the Parliament of Portugal agreed the participation of the Portuguese Army on the Western Front. In addition to a heavy artillery corps of 1,000 men under the command of the French Army, most of the Portuguese forces to be sent to the Western Front were to be incorporated in the CEP – Corpo Expedicionário Português (Portuguese Expeditionary Corps) under British command. The CEP was organised as an army corps of two divisions and corps troops, totalling 55,000 men, under the command of General Tamagnini de Abreu. The first CEP troops arrived in France on 2 February 1917. The first troops reached the front on 4 April. On 4 June, the 1st Infantry Brigade of the 1st Division repelled the first major attack made by the German Army against the lines defended by the CEP troops. On 5 November 1917 the CEP assumed the responsibility for an autonomous sector in the front, under the direct command of First Army. Most of the CEP was destroyed in the Battle of the Lys on 9 April 1918, losing more than 7,000 men. From July 1918, the remaining men of the CEP participated in the final allied offensives under the command of Fifth Army.

=== Newfoundland Regiment ===
Newfoundland in 1914 was not yet part of Canada. The tiny Dominion with a population of only 240,000 raised a force that eventually reached a strength of three battalions to serve in the war. The Newfoundland Regiment deployed to France in March 1916, as part of the 29th Division, after already having served in the Gallipoli Campaign. The Newfoundland Regiment was practically wiped out on the first day of the Battle of the Somme, suffering over 90% casualties. After receiving reinforcements, the Newfoundland Regiment continued to serve on the Western Front until the war's end. In honour of the regiment's service the privilege of adding the prefix Royal to the regiment's name was granted in December 1917, and the regiment was known as the Royal Newfoundland Regiment from that point on.

=== British West Indies Regiment ===
The British West Indies Regiment was a unit of the British Army during the First World War, formed from volunteers from British colonies in the West Indies.

== Weapons ==
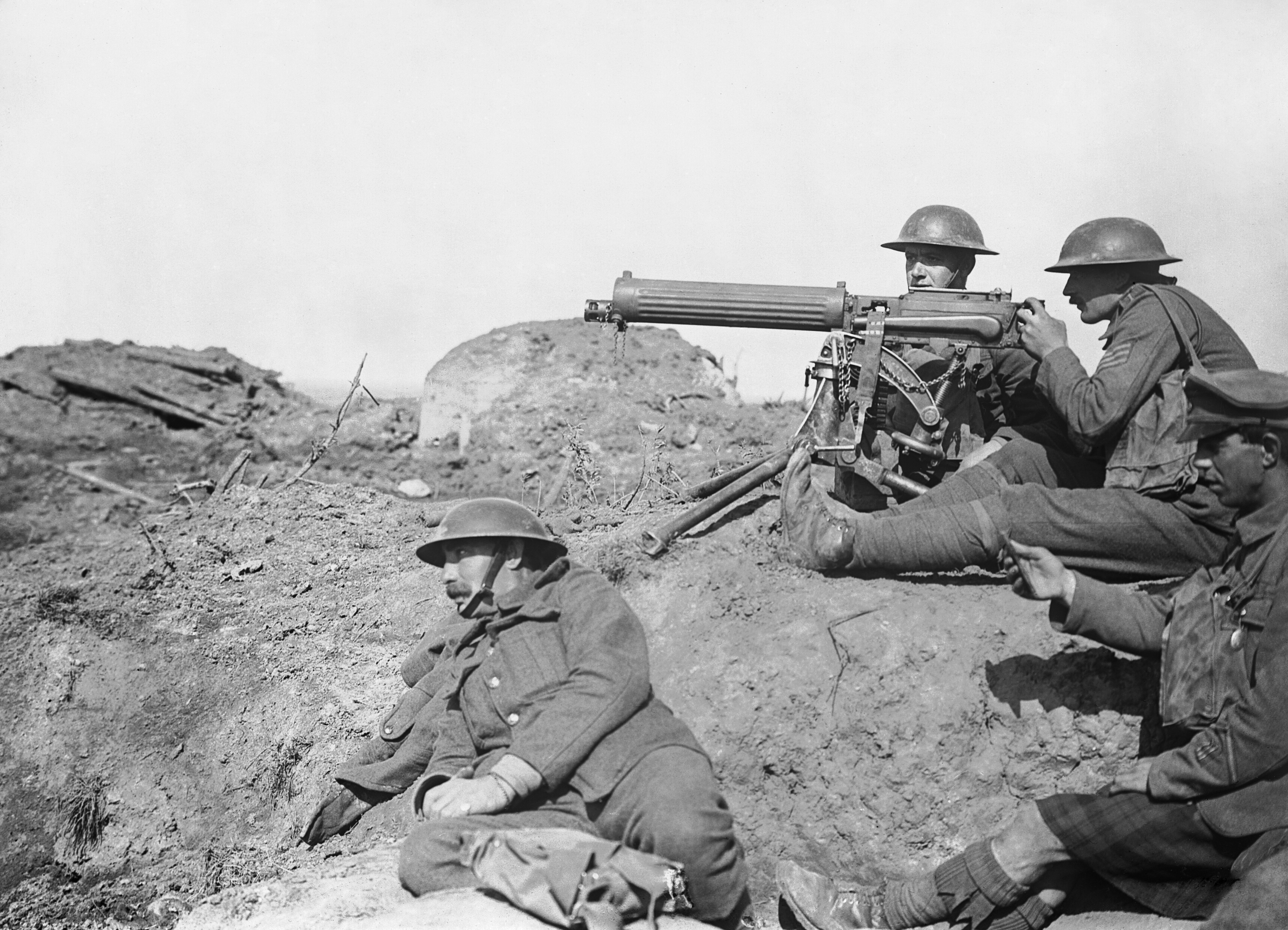
British Vickers gun crew

Until 1914, British infantry officers still carried swords and the cavalry retained the cavalry sword throughout the war. The other officers' weapon was the revolver, the three most common being the Webley MK V or VI, the Colt New Service and the Smith & Wesson hand ejector.

All other ranks in the BEF carried a .303 Lee–Enfield rifle fitted with an easily loaded ten-round magazine and issued with a seventeen-inch (430 mm) bayonet. These rifles enabled a high rate of fire with good accuracy, such that pre-war British soldiers were trained to hit a target fifteen times a minute at a range of 300 yards. The devastating efficiency and accuracy of the BEF infantry led the Germans to incorrectly believe that there were approximately 28 machine guns in each battalion.

When the BEF landed in France each infantry battalion and cavalry regiment was equipped with two Vickers or Maxim machine guns. Part of the reason for only allocating two guns per unit was the cost of manufacture and the need of a ten-week intensive training course for a Vickers gunner. During the course of 1916, the quicker to manufacture and more versatile Lewis guns began to be issued on the intended scale of the sixteen per battalion, one for each platoon. At the same time, the Vickers guns and their trained operators were redeployed to specialist companies of the Machine Gun Corps; one company was attached to each infantry brigade.

== Campaign medals ==
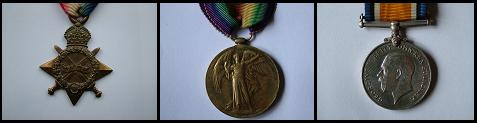
From Left 1914–1915 Star, Victory Medal, British War Medal

As well as individual gallantry awards, all members of the BEF qualified for up to three campaign medals. The 1914 Star, the 1914–15 Star, the British War Medal and the Victory Medal.

The 1914 Star was issued to officers and men of British forces who served in France or Belgium between 5 August and midnight 22/23 November 1914. The former date is the day after Britain's declaration of war against the Central Powers, and the closing date marks the end of the First Battle of Ypres.

The 1914–1915 Star was issued to officers and men of British and Imperial forces who served in any theatre of the War between 5 August 1914 and 31 December 1915 (other than those who had already qualified for the 1914 Star).

The British War Medal was issued to officers and men of British and Imperial forces who had rendered service between 5 August 1914 and 11 November 1918. Officers and men of the Royal Navy, Royal Marines, and Dominion and Colonial naval forces (including reserves) were required to have completed 28 days mobilised service — the medal was automatically awarded in the event of death on active service before the completion of this period.

The Victory Medal was issued to all those who received the 1914 Star or the 1914–1915 Star, and to those who were awarded the British War Medal. It was never awarded singly. Women qualified for this and the earlier two medals, for service in nursing homes and other auxiliary forces.

The Territorial Force War Medal was only awarded soldiers in the Territorial Force. To qualify, the recipient had to have been a member of the Territorial Force on or prior to 30 September 1914, and to have served in an operational theatre outside of the United Kingdom between 5 August 1914 and 11 November 1918.

The Silver War Badge was issued in the United Kingdom to service personnel who had been honourably discharged due to wounds or sickness during the War. The badge, sometimes known as the Discharge Badge, Wound Badge or Services Rendered Badge, was first issued in September 1916, along with an official certificate of entitlement.

== Aftermath ==
The British Army during the Great War was the largest military force that Britain had ever put into the field up to that point. On the Western Front, the British Expeditionary Force ended the war as a strong fighting force, more experienced and slightly bigger than the United States Army and with better morale than the French Army. The cost of victory, however, was high. The official "final and corrected" casualty figures for the British Army, including the Territorial Force, were issued on 10 March 1921. The losses for the period between 4 August 1914, and 30 September 1919, included 573,507 "killed in action, died from wounds and died of other causes" and 254,176 missing (minus 154,308 released prisoners), for a net total of 673,375 dead and missing. Casualty figures also indicated that there were 1,643,469 wounded.
