= List of Australian Army artillery units in World War I =

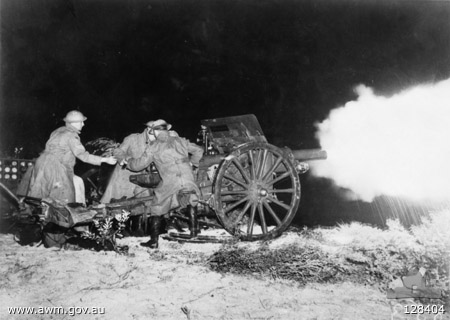
Members of the 1st Field Brigade firing an 18 pounder gun during a night exercise

The following is a list of Australian Army artillery units in World War I.

== Divisional Artillery ==
=== 1st Division Artillery ===
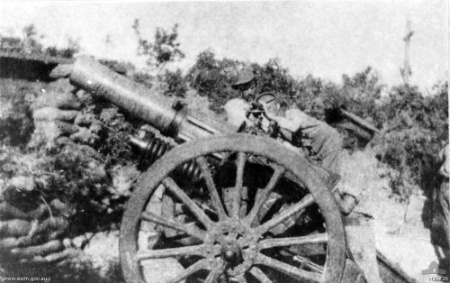
The Kangar, a 6 inch 30 cwt howitzer, about to open fire on the "Olive Grove" from "White's Valley", Gallipoli August 1915.

Formed August 1914 and assigned to 1st Division.

Subunits:

- 1st Division Ammunition Column August 1914 – past November 1918
- 1st Field Artillery Brigade August 1914 – past November 1918
  - 1st Field Artillery Battery
  - 2nd Field Artillery Battery
  - 3rd Field Artillery Battery
  - 101st Field Artillery (Howitzer) Battery
  - 1st Brigade Ammunition Column
- 2nd Field Artillery Brigade August 1914 – past November 1918
  - 4th Field Artillery Battery
  - 5th Field Artillery Battery
  - 6th Field Artillery Battery
  - 102nd Field Artillery (Howitzer) Battery
  - 2nd Brigade Ammunition Column
- 3rd Field Artillery Brigade August 1914 – 20 January 1917
  - 7th Field Artillery Battery
  - 8th Field Artillery Battery
  - 9th Field Artillery Battery
  - 103rd Field Artillery (Howitzer) Battery
  - 3rd Brigade Ammunition Column
- 21st Field Artillery (Howitzer) Brigade February 1916 – 23 January 1917
  - 22nd Field Artillery Battery
  - 23rd Field Artillery Battery
  - 24th Field Artillery Battery
  - 116th Field Artillery (Howitzer) Battery
  - 21st Brigade Ammunition Column
- V1A Heavy Trench Mortar Battery 17 April 1916 – 21 February 1918
- X1A Medium Trench Mortar Battery 17 April 1916 – 21 February 1918
- Y1A Medium Trench Mortar Battery 17 April 1916 – 21 February 1918
- Z1A Medium Trench Mortar Battery 17 April 1916 – 21 February 1918
- 1st Medium Trench Mortar Battery 21 February 1918 – past November 1918
- 2nd Medium Trench Mortar Battery 21 February 1918 – past November 1918
- 1st Heavy Artillery Battery 14 July 1915 - February 1916

=== 2nd Division Artillery ===
Formed September 1915 and assigned to 2nd Division

Subunits:

- 2nd Division Ammunition Column September 1915 – past November 1918
- 4th Field Artillery Brigade 23 September 1915 – past November 1918
  - 10th Field Artillery Battery
  - 11th Field Artillery Battery
  - 12th Field Artillery Battery
  - 104th Field Artillery (Howitzer) Battery
  - 4th Brigade Ammunition Column
- 5th Field Artillery Brigade 6 September 1915 – past November 1918
  - 13th Field Artillery Battery
  - 14th Field Artillery Battery
  - 15th Field Artillery Battery
  - 105th Field Artillery (Howitzer) Battery
  - 5th Brigade Ammunition Column
- 6th Field Artillery Brigade 19 October 1915 – 20 January 1917
  - 16th Field Artillery Battery
  - 17th Field Artillery Battery
  - 18th Field Artillery Battery
  - 106th Field Artillery (Howitzer) Battery
  - 6th Brigade Ammunition Column
- 22nd Field Artillery (Howitzer) Brigade February 1916 – 27 January 1917
  - 19th Field Artillery Battery
  - 20th Field Artillery Battery
  - 21st Field Artillery Battery
  - 117th Field Artillery (Howitzer) Battery
  - 22nd Brigade Ammunition Column
- V2A Heavy Trench Mortar Batter 17 April 1916 – 21 February 1918
- X2A Medium Trench Mortar Battery 17 April 1916 – 21 February 1918
- Y2A Medium Trench Mortar Battery 17 April 1916 – 21 February 1918
- Z2A Medium Trench Mortar Battery 17 April 1916 – 21 February 1918
- 3rd Medium Trench Mortar Battery 21 February 1918 – past November 1918
- 4th Medium Trench Mortar Battery 21 February 1918 – past November 1918

=== 3rd Division Artillery ===
Formed February 1916 for 3rd Division

Subunits:

- 3rd Division Ammunition Column February 1916 – past November 1918
- 7th Field Artillery Brigade February 1916 – past November 1918
  - 25th Field Artillery Battery
  - 26th Field Artillery Battery
  - 27th Field Artillery Battery
  - 107th Field Artillery (Howitzer) Battery
  - 7th Brigade Ammunition Column
- 8th Field Artillery Brigade February 1916 – past November 1918
  - 29th Field Artillery Battery
  - 30th Field Artillery Battery
  - 31st Field Artillery Battery
  - 108th Field Artillery (Howitzer) Battery
  - 8th Brigade Ammunition Column
- 9th Field Artillery Brigade February 1916 – 6 January 1917
  - 33rd Field Artillery Battery
  - 34th Field Artillery Battery
  - 35th Field Artillery Battery
  - 118th Field Artillery (Howitzer) Battery
  - 9th Brigade Ammunition Column
- 23rd Field Artillery (Howitzer) Brigade February 1916 – 6 January 1917
  - 28th Field Artillery Battery
  - 32nd Field Artillery Battery
  - 36th Field Artillery Battery
  - 109th Field Artillery (Howitzer) Battery
  - 23rd Brigade Ammunition Column
- V3A Heavy Trench Mortar Battery August 1916 – 21 February 1918
- X3A Medium Trench Mortar Battery August 1916 – 21 February 1918
- Y3A Medium Trench Mortar Battery August 1916 – 21 February 1918
- Z3A Medium Trench Mortar Battery August 1916 – 21 February 1918
- 5th Medium Trench Mortar Battery 21 February 1918 – past November 1918
- 6th Medium Trench Mortar Battery 21 February 1918 – past November 1918

=== 4th Division Artillery ===
Formed Egypt February 1916 for 4th Division

Subunits:

- 4th Division Ammunition Column February 1916 – past November 1918
- 10th Field Artillery Brigade February 1916 – past November 1918
  - 37th Field Artillery Battery
  - 38th Field Artillery Battery
  - 39th Field Artillery Battery
  - 110th Field Artillery (Howitzer) Battery
  - 10th Brigade Ammunition Column
- 11th Field Artillery Brigade February 1916 – past November 1918
  - 41st Field Artillery Battery
  - 42nd Field Artillery Battery
  - 43rd Field Artillery Battery
  - 111th Field Artillery (Howitzer) Battery
  - 11th Brigade Ammunition Column
- 12th Field Artillery Brigade February 1916 – 20 January 1917
  - 45th Field Artillery Battery
  - 46th Field Artillery Battery
  - 47th Field Artillery Battery
  - 101st Field Artillery (Howitzer) Battery
  - 119th Field Artillery (Howitzer) Battery
  - 12th Brigade Ammunition Column
- 24th Field Artillery (Howitzer) Brigade February 1916 – 23 January 1917
  - 40th Field Artillery Battery
  - 44th Field Artillery Battery
  - 48th Field Artillery Battery
  - 24th Brigade Ammunition Column
- V4A Heavy Trench Mortar Battery June 1916 – 21 February 1918
- X4A Medium Trench Mortar Battery June 1916 – 21 February 1918
- Y4A Medium Trench Mortar Battery June 1916 – 21 February 1918
- Z4A Medium Trench Mortar Battery June 1916 – 21 February 1918
- 7th Medium Trench Mortar Battery 21 February 1918 – past November 1918
- 8th Medium Trench Mortar Battery 21 February 1918 – past November 1918

=== 5th Division Artillery ===
Formed Egypt February 1916 for 5th Division

Subunits:

- 5th Division Ammunition Column February 1916 – past November 1918
- 13th Field Artillery Brigade February 1916 – past November 1918
  - 49th Field Artillery Battery
  - 50th Field Artillery Battery
  - 51st Field Artillery Battery
  - 113th Field Artillery (Howitzer) Battery
  - 13th Brigade Ammunition Column
- 14th Field Artillery Brigade February 1916 – past November 1918
  - 53rd Field Artillery Battery
  - 54th Field Artillery Battery
  - 55th Field Artillery Battery
  - 114th Field Artillery (Howitzer) Battery
  - 14th Brigade Ammunition Column
- 15th Field Artillery Brigade February 1916 – 22 January 1917
  - 57th Field Artillery Battery
  - 58th Field Artillery Battery
  - 59th Field Artillery Battery
  - 15th Brigade Ammunition Column
- 25th Field Artillery (Howitzer) Brigade February 1916 – 23 January 1917
  - 120th Field Artillery (Howitzer) Battery
  - 52nd Field Artillery Battery
  - 56th Field Artillery Battery
  - 60th Field Artillery Battery
  - 115th Field Artillery (Howitzer) Battery
  - 25th Brigade Ammunition Column
- V5A Heavy Trench Mortar Battery June 1916 – 21 February 1918
- X5A Medium Trench Mortar Battery June 1916 – 21 February 1918
- Y5A Medium Trench Mortar Battery June 1916 – 21 February 1918
- Z5A Medium Trench Mortar Battery June 1916 – 21 February 1918
- 9th Medium Trench Mortar Battery 21 February 1918 – past November 1918
- 10th Medium Trench Mortar Battery 21 February 1918 – past November 1918

== Siege artillery ==
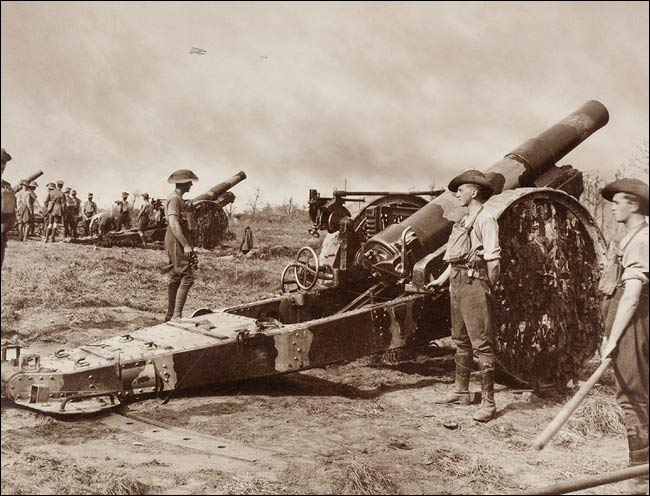
54th Siege Battery with its 8-inch howitzers, Western Front.

- 1st Siege Artillery Brigade
  - 1st Siege Artillery Battery (Renamed to the 54th Siege Battery in September 1915, renamed back in March 1918)
  - 2nd Siege Artillery Battery (Renamed to the 55th Siege Battery in September 1915, renamed back in March 1918)
  - 338th Siege Artillery Battery
  - 1st Siege Battery Ammunition Column
  - 2nd Siege Battery Ammunition Column

== Captured Gun units ==
- 'A' Captured Gun Battery September 1918 - past November 1918

== Heavy trench mortar batteries ==
- V Heavy Trench Mortar Battery February 1918 - 19 September 1918

== Reserve units ==
- Reserve Artillery Brigade 28 November 1916 - 1919
  - 1st Field Artillery Training Battery
  - 2nd Field Artillery Training Battery
  - 3rd Field Artillery Training Battery
  - 4th Field Artillery Training Battery
  - 5th Field Artillery Training Battery

== Training depot ==
- Artillery Training Depot January 1916 - 28 November 1916

== See also ==
- Royal Regiment of Australian Artillery
- Military history of Australia during World War I
