= Reserve Artillery Brigade (Australia) =

- Active: January 1916 – 28 November 1916 (As the Artillery Training Depot); 28 November 1916 – 1919
- Country: Australia
- Branch: Australian Army
- Type: Artillery
- Role: Training
- Size: 5 batteries
- Part of: First Australian Imperial Force

The Reserve Artillery Brigade was an artillery unit raised as part of the First Australian Imperial Force during World War I. Formed in Egypt in January 1916 as the Artillery Training Depot. The formation arrived in England on 20 June 1916. The brigade was officially renamed the Reserve Artillery Brigade on 28 November 1916. It was made up of five field batteries and provided trained reinforcements to units deployed on the Western Front.

== Composition ==
1st Field Training Battery
The battery was formed in England on 28 November 1916 and supplied howitzer batteries with reinforcements.

2nd Field Artillery Battery
2nd Battery was formed in England on 28 November 1916 and supplied the 18-pounder batteries of the 1st and 2nd Divisions with reinforcements.

3rd Field Artillery Battery
3rd Battery was formed in England on 28 November 1916 and supplied the 18-pounder batteries of the 4th and 5th Divisions with reinforcements.

4th Field Artillery Battery
The battery was formed in England on 8 November 1916 and supplied batteries of the 5th Division and the Army brigades with reinforcements.

5th Field Artillery Battery
The 5th Battery was formed in England on 8 November 1916, but was disbanded on 27 September 1917 and it saw little action.
