= 1st Siege Artillery Battery (Australia) =

First World War Australian artillery

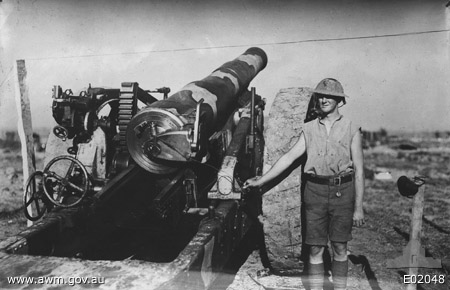
A 1st Siege Battery 8 inch howitzer and Gunner Harold Alexander Triggs in 1917

1st Siege Artillery Battery was formed in Victoria during April 1915. The battery departed Melbourne on 17 July 1915 and served on the Western Front during World War I. The battery along with the 2nd Siege Artillery Battery made up the 1st Siege Artillery Brigade. 1st Siege Artillery Battery was renamed the 54th Siege Artillery Battery on 28 September 1915. The battery was equipped first with four 8 inch howitzers and then 6 from July 1917. In March 1918 the battery was assigned to the Australian Corps Heavy Artillery and resumed its original title.

== Image gallery ==
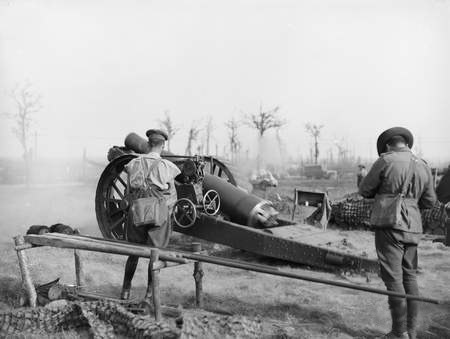
In action on the Ypres-Comines Canal near Lock 8, 15 September 1917

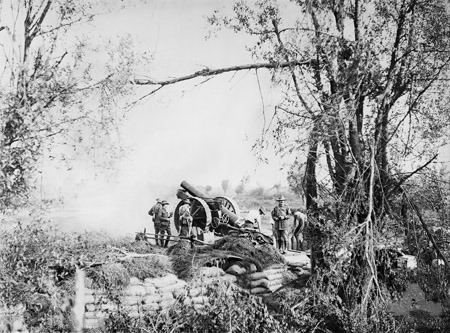
In action at Voormezeele, 15 September 1917

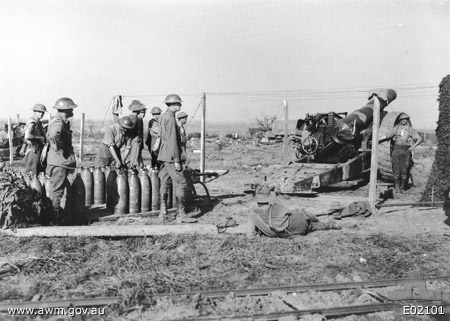
In action near Gordon Roads, 17 September 1917

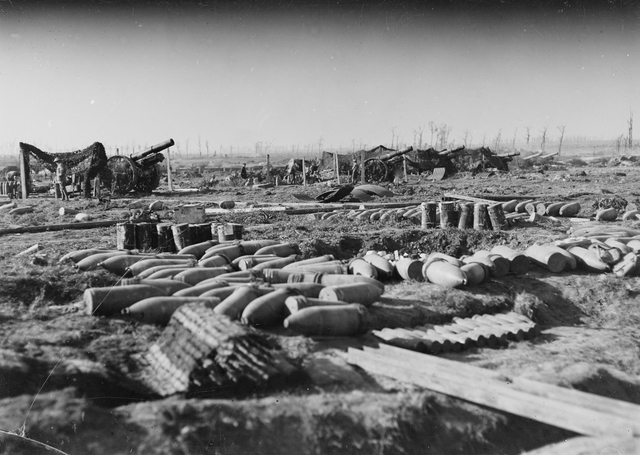
At Birr Cross Roads, 26 September 1917

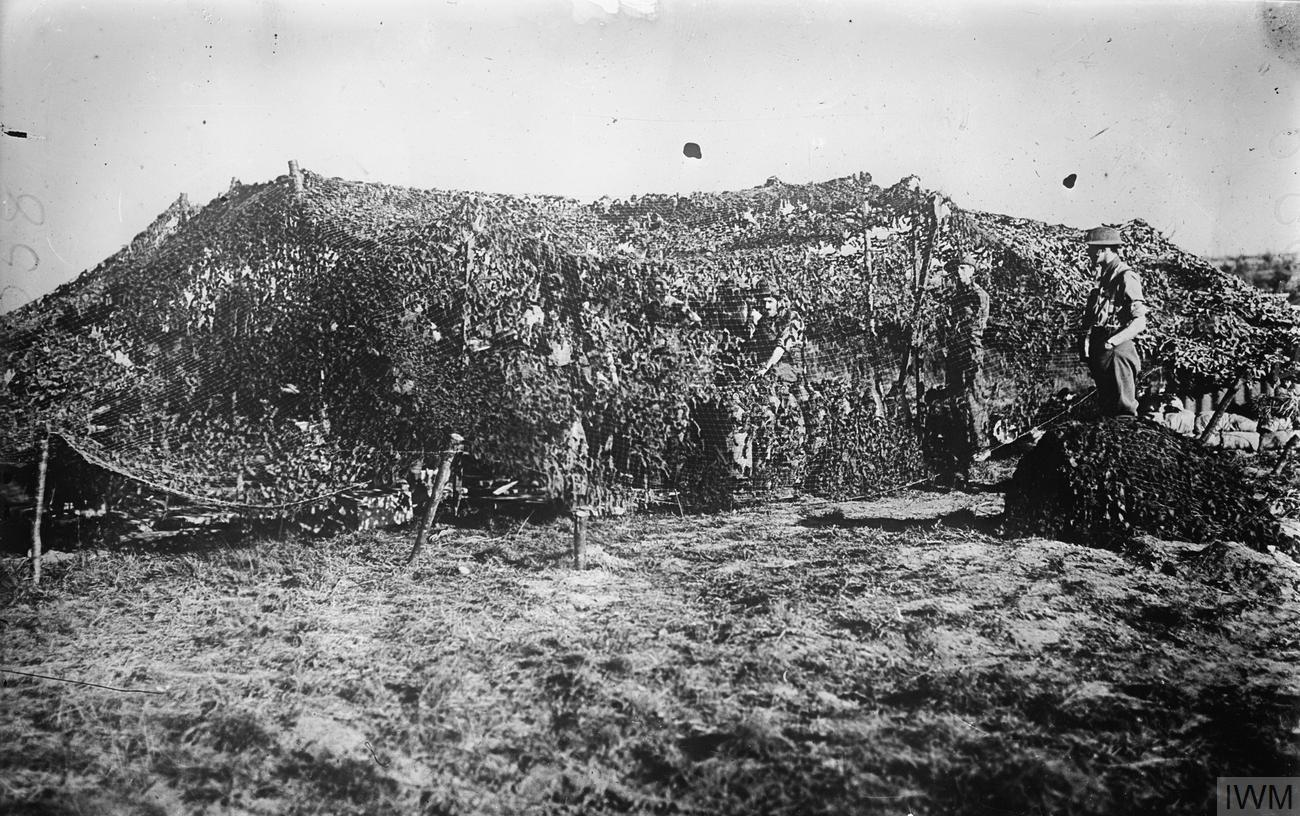
At Gordon Road, October 1917

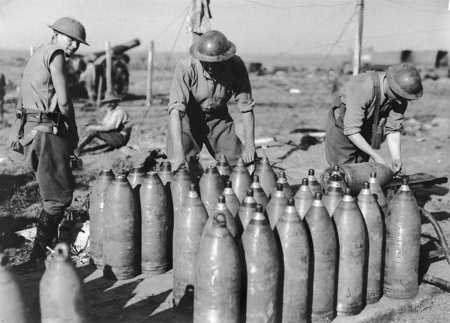
Capping shells, Verbranden Road, 17 October 1917

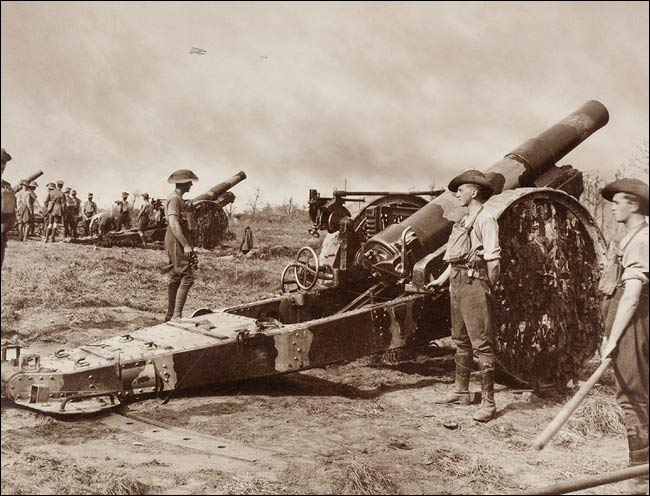
54th Siege Battery with its 8-inch howitzers, Western Front.

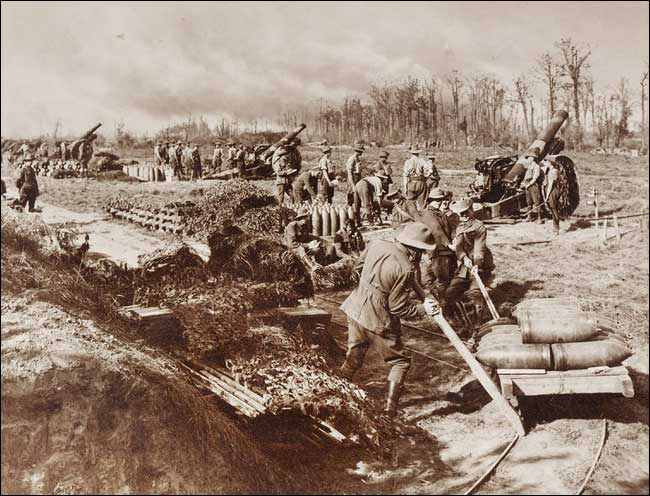
Bringing up shells by light rail for 54th Siege Battery.

== See also ==
- Australian Army Artillery Units, World War I
