= BL 8-inch howitzer Mk VI–VIII =

Series of British heavy howitzers

BL 8-inch howitzer Mk VI, VII, VIII
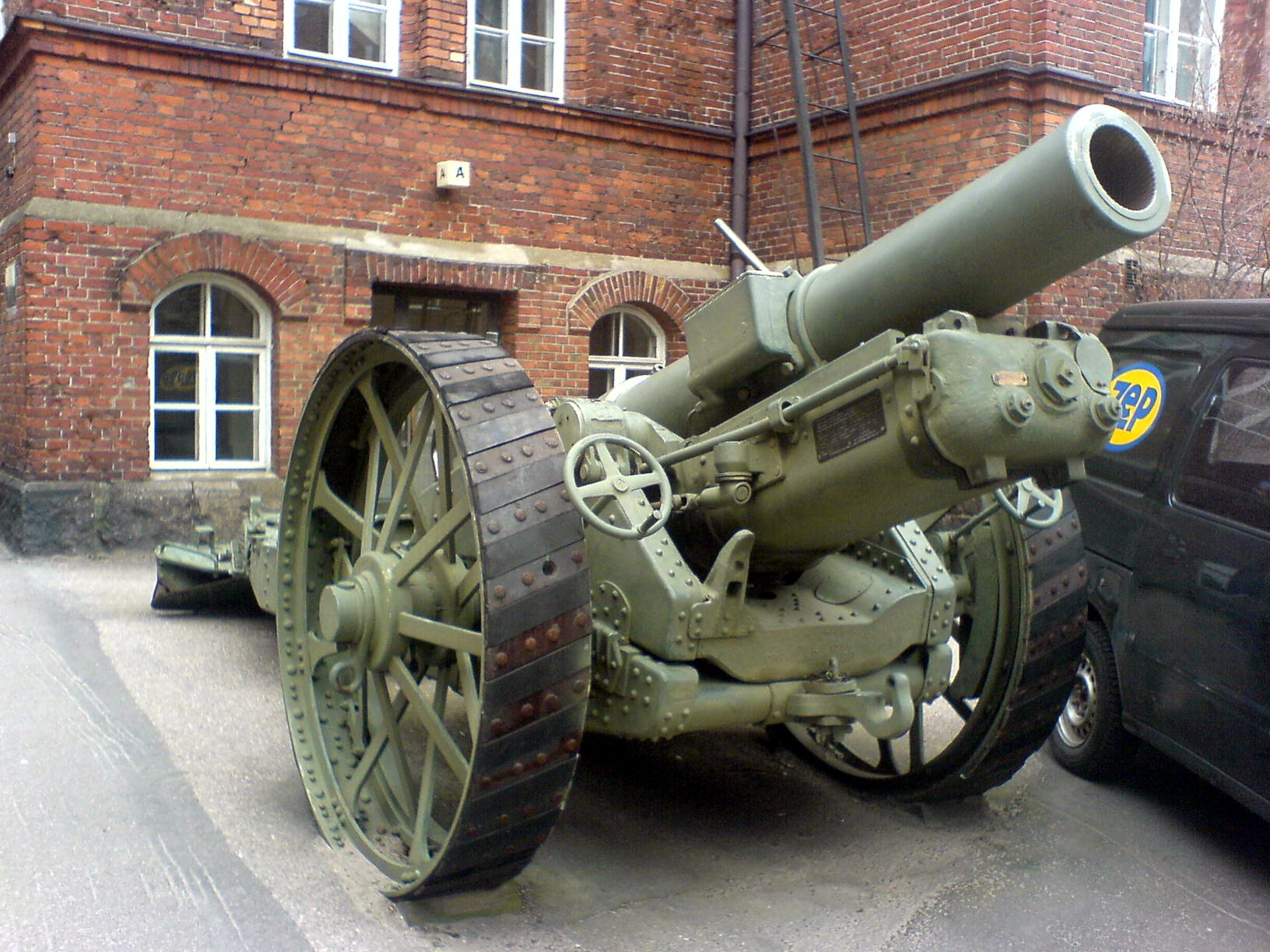
- US-built version of Vickers BL 8-inch howitzer Mk 6 outside the War Museum in Helsinki, Finland
- Type: Heavy howitzer
- Place of origin: United Kingdom

Service history
- In service: 1916–1943; 1940–1960s (Finland)
- Used by: See Operators
- Wars: World War I World War II; Continuation War

Production history
- Designer: Vickers-Armstrongs
- Designed: 1915
- Manufacturer: List of manufacturers: Vickers-Armstrongs; Beardmore; Woolwich; Midvale Steel; Major assemblies by Hadfield and Beyer, Peacock & Company.
- Developed into: BL 7.2-inch howitzer Mk.I – IV
- No. built: UK contracts: 711 + equivalent complete equipments.

Specifications
- Mass: Mk VI: 19,200 lb (8,700 kg); Mk VIII: 20,048 lb (9,094 kg)
- Barrel length: Mk VI: 9 ft 9 in (2.972 m) L/14.3; Mk VII, VIII: 11 ft 6 in (3.505 m) L/17.3
- Shell: HE
- Shell weight: 200 lb (90.7 kg)
- Calibre: 8-inch (203.2 mm)
- Breech: Welin interrupted screw with Asbury mechanism
- Recoil: Hydro-pneumatic recuperator, hydraulic buffer
- Carriage: Wheeled, box trail
- Elevation: Mk VI: −4° to 50° Mk VII, VIII: 0° to 45°
- Traverse: 4° L & R
- Muzzle velocity: Mk VI: 1,272 ft/s (388 m/s); Mk VII, VIII: 1,500 ft/s (457 m/s)
- Maximum firing range: Mk VI: 10,400 yd (9,500 m); Mk VII, VIII: 12,400 yd (11,300 m)

The BL 8-inch howitzer Marks VI, VII and VIII (6, 7 and 8) were a series of British artillery siege howitzers on mobile carriages of a new design introduced in World War I. (Note: Britain used Roman numerals to designate Marks (i.e. models) of ordnance until after World War II. Hence this article refers to the sixth, seventh and eighth models of British BL 8-inch howitzers) They were designed by Vickers in Britain and produced by all four British artillery manufacturers, but were mainly produced by Armstrong and an American company. They were the equivalents of the German 21 cm Morser 16 and in British service were used similarly to the BL 9.2-inch howitzer but were quicker to manufacture and more mobile. They delivered a 200 lb (91 kg) shell to 12,300 yd (7.0 mi; 11.2 km). They had limited service in the British Army in World War II before being converted to the new 7.2 in (180 mm) calibre. They also equipped a small number of Australian and Canadian batteries in World War I and by the US Army in that war. They were used in small numbers by other European armies.

== Design and variants ==
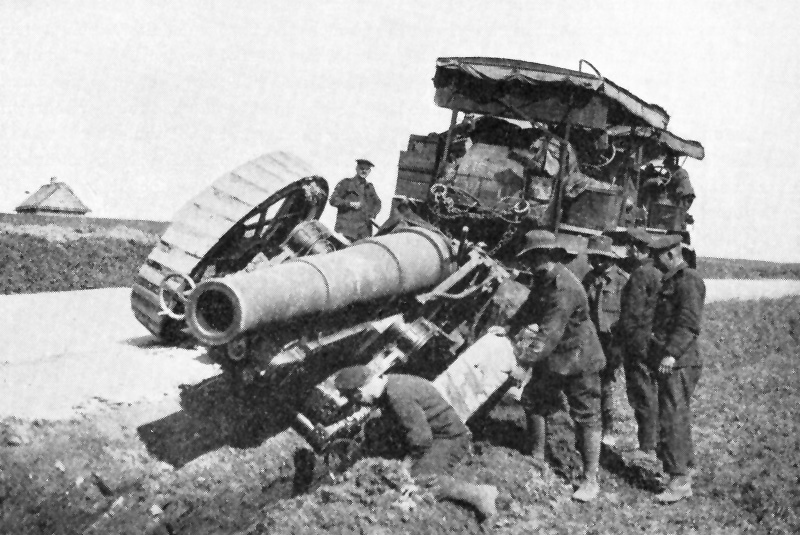
Mk VI that has slid off-road behind a Holt 75 artillery tractor, WWI

8-inch was a calibre adopted in the First World War by the British Army. The Marks VI, VII and VIII (6, 7 and 8) were a new design and not related to the stopgap early Marks I-V of 8-inch howitzer, which used shortened and bored-out naval 6-inch (150 mm) gun barrels.

=== Mark VI ===
The Vickers design, very similar to their 6-inch howitzer, was approved in August 1915 and first substantial order placed in March 1916 for 50 howitzers, with 30 more in the autumn. It was 4–5 tonnes lighter than the improvised 8-inch "howitzers" Mks I – V. The Mk VI barrel was of built-up construction and was 14.7 calibres (117.7 inches (2.99 m)) long, with a range of 10,745 yards (9,825 m).

=== Mark VII ===
Introduced in July 1916, the Mk VII had a longer barrel (17.3 calibres, or 138.4 inches (3.52 m)) of wire-wound construction and increased the range to 12,300 yards (11,200 m). The new barrels turned out to have short service lives and suffered from cracked A tubes (the inner rifled layer of the built-up barrel).

=== Mark VIII ===
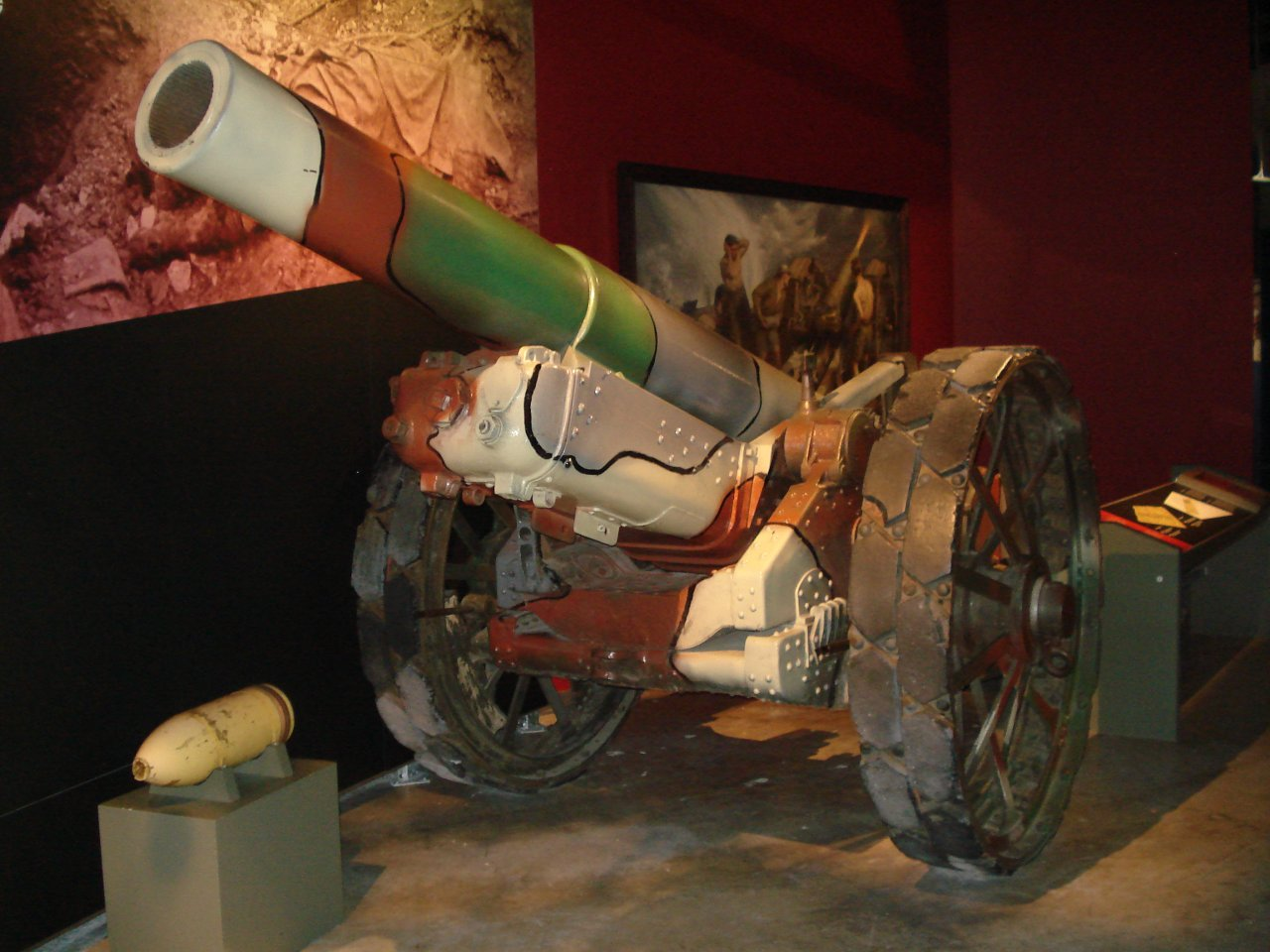
Mk 8 in WWI camouflage paint at the Canadian War Museum, Ottawa

The Mk VIII incorporated various small improvements and a thicker and stronger barrel.

== Service History ==
=== United Kingdom ===
==== World War I ====
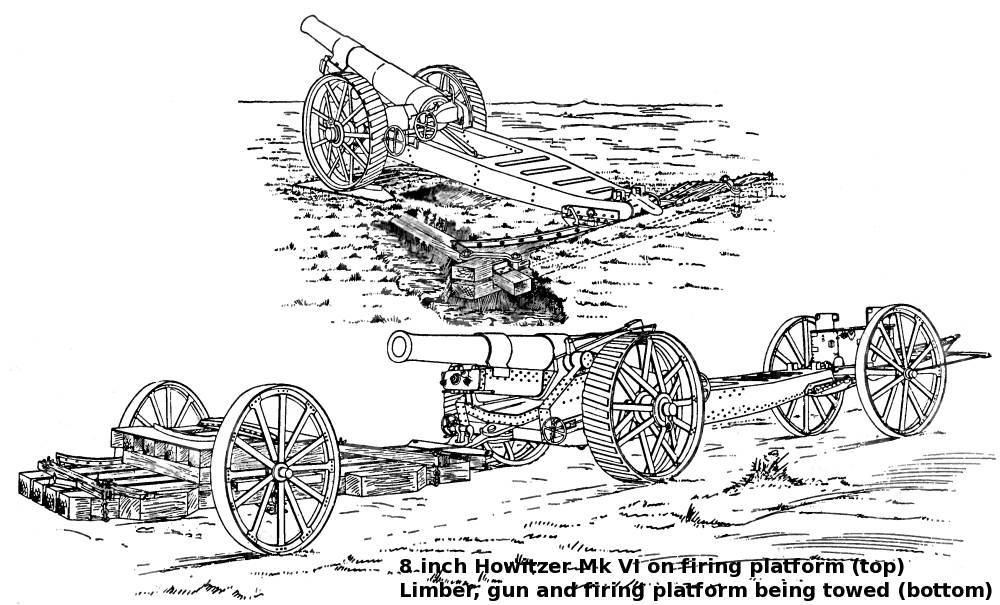
Gun on Vickers firing platform, and limber, gun and platform being towed

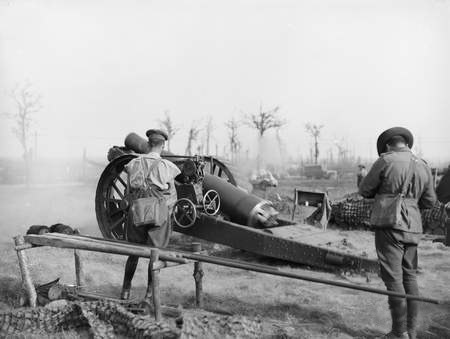
Australian gun at full recoil after firing, Third Battle of Ypres, 15 September 1917

Early problems of stability on very hard or soft ground became apparent with the Mk VI, leading to the recoil system not functioning correctly. A Commission went to France to investigate, and a special level "Vickers platform" was adopted, to which the wheels and trail were secured for accurate shooting. A major change in the line of shooting required the platform to be relaid. Setting up and adjusting the platform was labour-intensive. The US manual describes it:

The platform consists of wooden beams which assemble to form a triangular platform. The spade must be removed and a special bracket fitted on the trail when using this platform. This bracket travels in a groove which gives a bearing for the bracket and also provides a means of traversing the piece 52° on the platform. The main objects in the use of the firing platform are: To provide a reliable support for the wheels and rear end of the trail, so as to prevent sinking or movement when firing on soft ground; to ensure the gun remaining on the target when firing; and to provide means for shifting the trail transversely through an angle of 52° (26° each side of center). By using the traversing gear on the carriage a total traverse of 30° on each side of the center is obtainable... The carriage wheels rest on steel plates on the wheel platform and are guided by curved-steel angles which prevent lateral movement of the gun off the target when in action. When the firing platform is used, the float plate, with spade attached, which is bolted to the underside of the trail, is removed and another float plate, having a thrust bracket attached, is bolted in its place.

At the end of World War I on the Western Front, Canada had two 6-gun batteries, Australia 1, Britain 37. British 8-inch howitzer batteries serving in other theatres at the Armistice were: UK 1 (6 guns), Macedonia 1 (4 guns) and 2 guns in Palestine

==== World War II ====
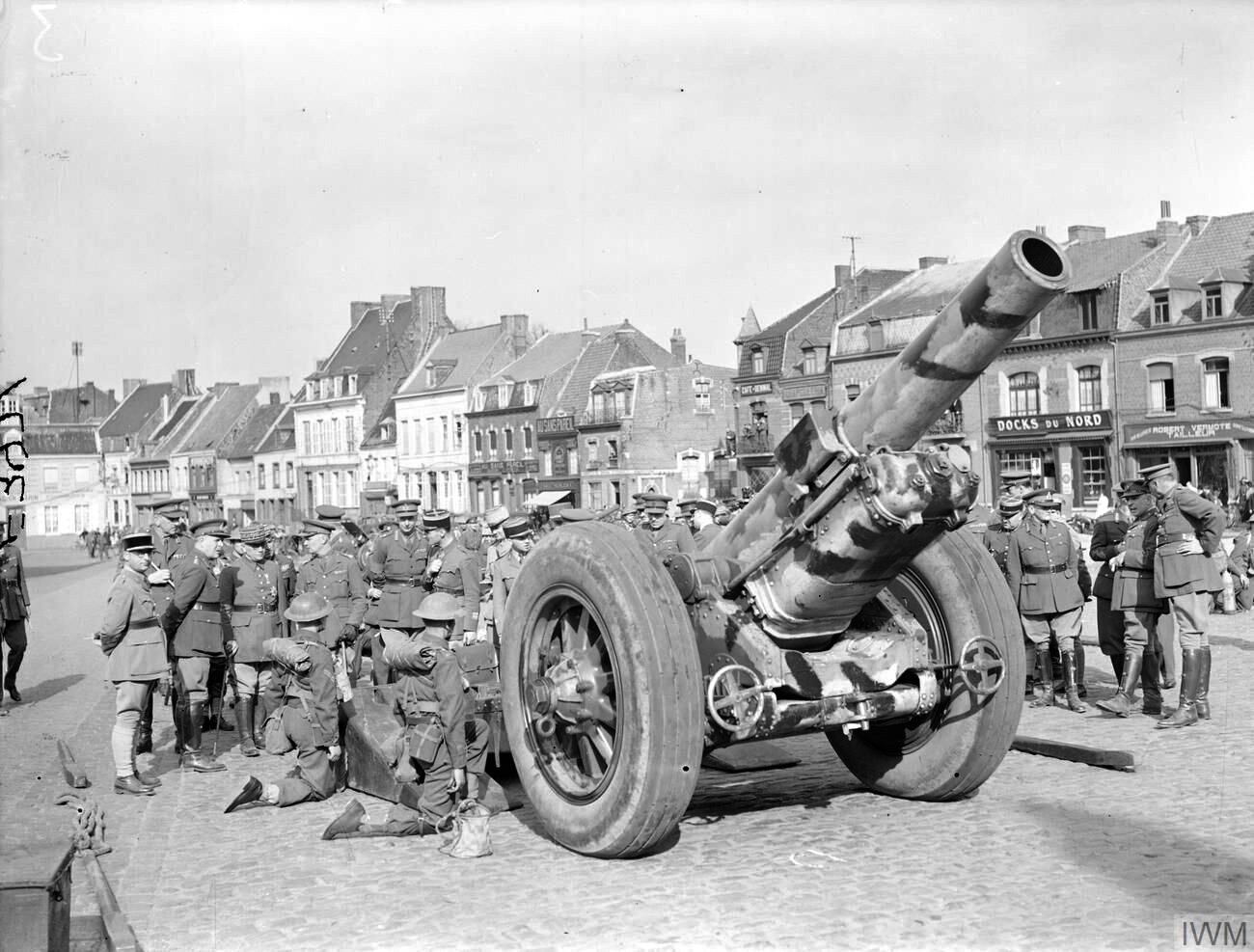
Mk 8, Béthune, France, 23 April 1940

At the start of World War II, some Mk 8s were used in France from May to June 1940. In March 1940, 266 weapons were authorised for transfer from the United States to the British. After the Fall of France, the remaining guns were used for training. In 1941 a further 168 weapons (the remaining US stock) were authorised for transfer to the British under Lend-Lease. The advent of the BL 7.2-inch howitzer meant that remaining 8-inch barrels were relined to 7.2 in (180 mm). With no guns left, they were declared obsolete by July 1943. Some Vickers 8-inch guns were present in Japanese island fortifications during the Pacific Campaign.

=== United States ===
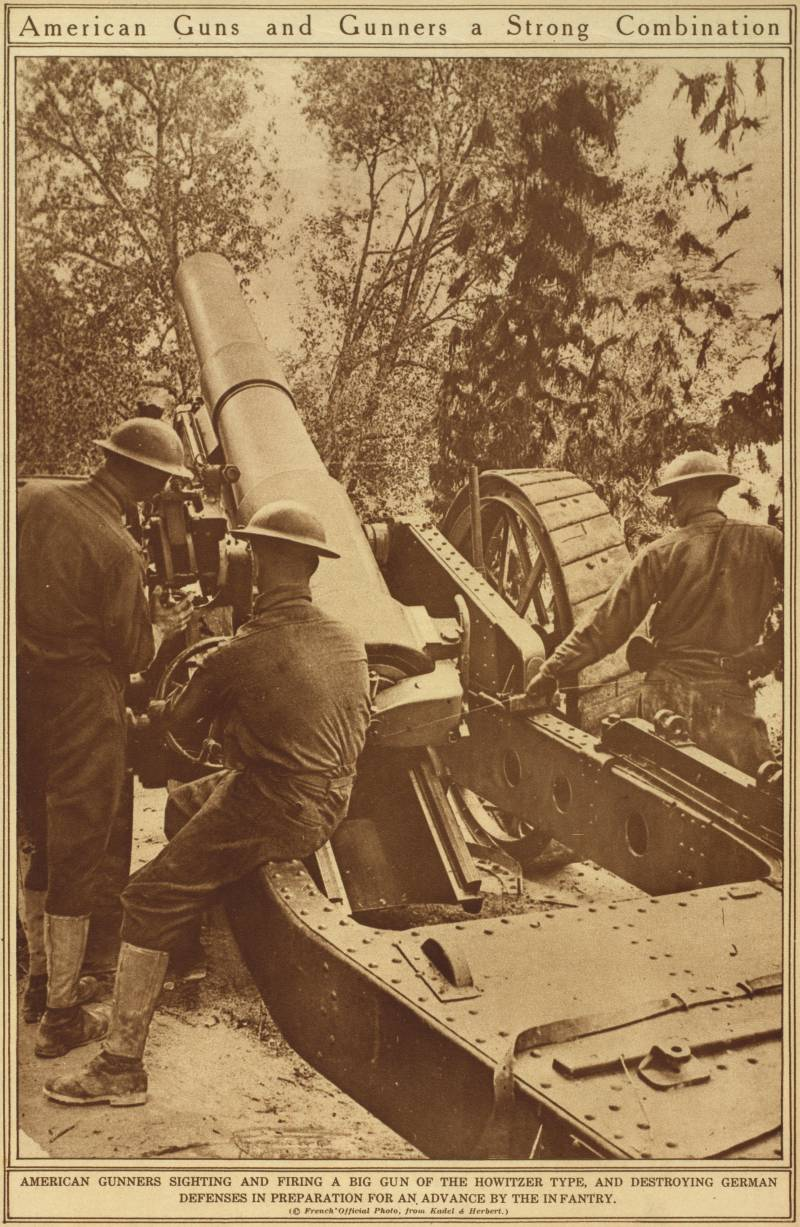
US gunners with Mk VI gun in France

Versions of the Mk 6 were manufactured in the United States by Midvale Steel and Ordnance Co, Nicetown, Pennsylvania during World War I, initially supplied to Britain and then used to equip US forces when it entered the war. These were designated the M1917 in US service.

A US Mk 7 and Mk 8 1/2 version was also manufactured and adopted in US service from October 1918 as the M1918. Quoting from the US Army manual of 1920 on artillery in US service:

"The 8-inch howitzer materiel is called the "Vickers" model of 1917, of which there are in use two types, the Mark VI and Mark VII. The main differences between the Mark VI and Mark VII being that the former has a lower muzzle velocity and consequently a shorter range than the latter, also that the Mark VII has a barrel of the "wire wound" construction, whereas the Mark VI type is of the "built up" construction...

The Mark VII has lately been superseded by a Mark VIII 1/2, the difference between the two being that the powder chamber walls of the Mark VII proved to be too thin, while the Mark VIII 1/2 overcomes this defect by having thicker powder chamber walls...

... the average life of the 8-inch howitzer, Mark VI, [before the barrel needs relining] is 7,800 rounds, while that of the Mark VIII 1/2 is 3,000 rounds.

The Mark VI howitzer has a muzzle velocity of 1,300 feet per second and a maximum range of 10,760 yards and is of British design and both British and American manufacture. The Mark VII howitzer has a muzzle velocity of 1,525 feet per second and maximum range of 12,280 yards and is of British design and manufacture.

The Mark VIII 1/2 is an American modification of the British wire-wound Mark VIII howitzer to permit of a built up type of construction and is strictly of American manufacture. The Mark VIII 1/2 has the same muzzle velocity and range as the Mark VIII.

Due to the combination of British and American manufacture, there are several types of breech mechanism in service; the two main types are the T and the French percussion type...

The Mark VIII 1/2 howitzer is also of the built-up-construction type, but differs from the Mark VI howitzer in that it consists of two tubes, an inner and an outer, over which is shrunk the jacket. The jacket in this case supports the howitzer, without the use of guide rings. A breech ring is shrunk on over the jacket and carries a lug for connecting the gun to the recoil mechanism. A breech bushing similar to that of the Mark VI is fitted for the breech mechanism. The total length of this howitzer is about 12 1/2 feet [compared to Mk VI 10 1/2 feet] and its maximum range is approximately 12,360 yards. This howitzer is mounted on the Mark VII carriage".

The 58th Regiment Coast Artillery Corps (C.A.C.) was in action in France in the final days of World War I with the US-manufactured Mk 6, and the 44th, 51st, and 59th Regiments were in action with British-manufactured versions. An additional six regiments, three with each type of gun, are described as being nearly ready for the front at the time of the Armistice. Each regiment had an authorised strength of 24 guns.

A total of at least 285 M1917 (Mark 6), 116 M1918 (Mark 7), and 61 M1918 (Mark 8 1/2) weapons were acquired by the US Army, plus 16 for the US Marine Corps. 52 weapons were purchased from the British beginning in January 1918; subsequent inventory figures indicate they were in addition to these totals. By 1922, the 8-inch howitzers were withdrawn from active units and stored as war reserves. A 1926 inventory showed 508 howitzers and 646 carriages in Army hands. An approximate total of 530 howitzers were acquired. In 1933, some of the howitzers' Asbury breech mechanisms were used in developing the 155 mm gun T3, eventually the M1 "Long Tom". In 1934, the Marine Corps weapons were transferred to the Army. In March 1940, 466 weapons were on hand; 266 of these were authorised for transfer to the British. A further 32 weapons were transferred to Finland in September 1940. In 1941, the remaining weapons were authorised for transfer to the British under Lend-Lease. None of these weapons were donated as war memorials, and none survive in the United States.

=== Finland ===
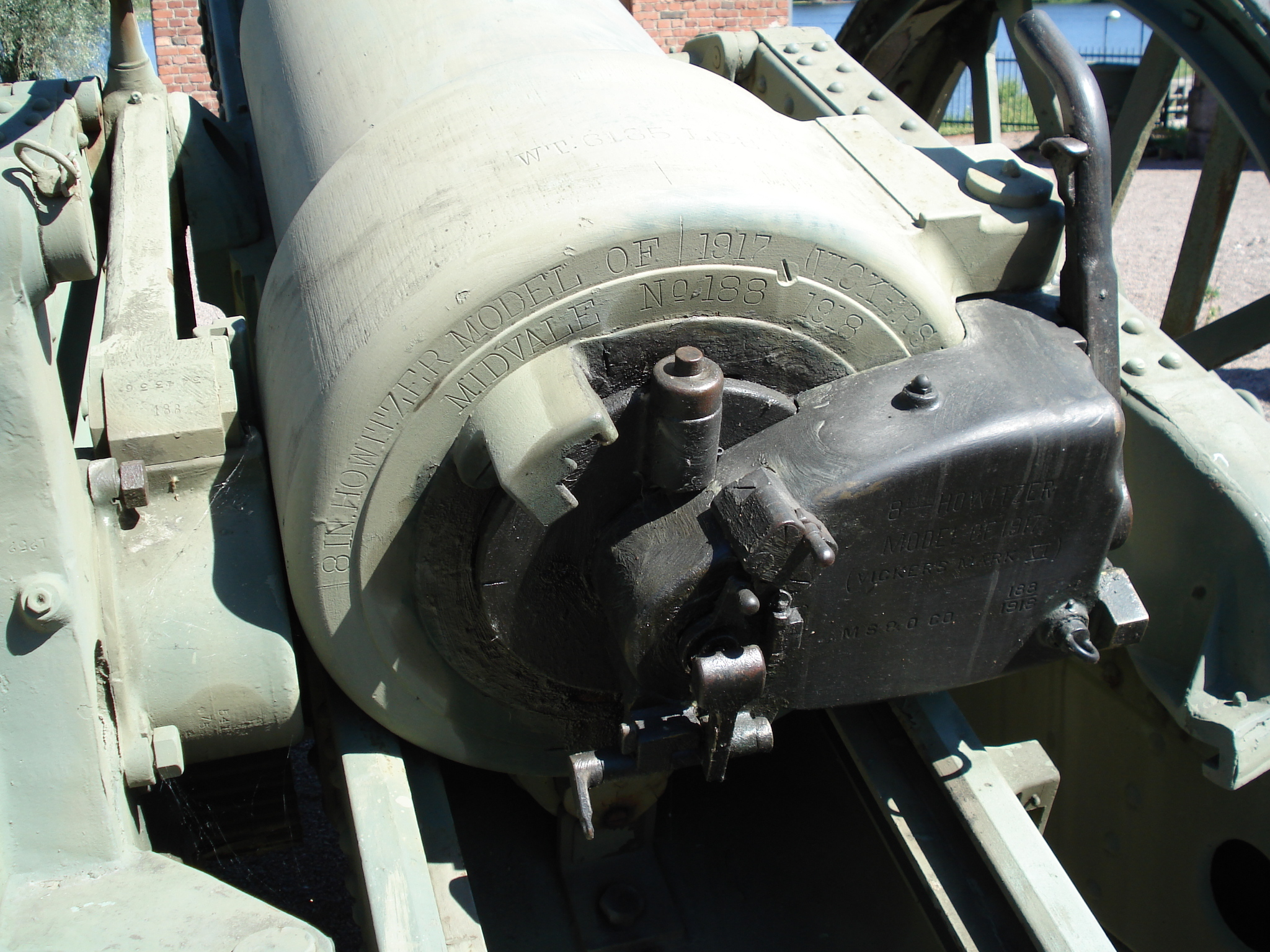
Breech of No. 188 built by Midvale used by Finland

During the Russo-Finnish Winter War, Finland found itself in dire need of heavy artillery. Thirty-two "8 in Howitzer Mk 7 (Vickers Mk 6)" 8-inch howitzers were bought from the United States in 1939 but arrived too late to see action in the war. The howitzers were given the designation 203 H/17 (Finnish: 203 mm, Haupitsi [Howitzer], 1917) and were first issued to three heavy artillery battalions (1st, 2nd and 3rd), which later were re-organised into six heavy artillery batteries (11th, 12th, 13th, 14th, 15th and 16th). The howitzer was well-liked by the Finnish Army for its durability. During the Continuation War, 13 of these howitzers were lost in the battles of the summer of 1944; eight of these belonged to Heavy Artillery Battery 4 and were lost at Valkeasaari on 10 June, while the other five belonged to Heavy Artillery Battery 3, located northeast of Lake Ladoga. The howitzers were stored after the war and were struck from the lists in the late 1960s.

== Operators ==
- Australia – 6 pieces, 54th Siege Artillery Battery, Royal Australian Artillery
- Canada
- Finland – 32 artillery pieces, known as 203 H/17
- France
- Japan – 24 artillery pieces, known as Type 7 203 mm
- Russian Empire – 72 howitzers Mk VI, designated 203 mm howitzer Model 1916 (203 mm howitzer M1916).
- Soviet Union – Inherited from Russian Empire.
- South Africa
- United Kingdom – Royal Garrison Artillery (amalgamated in 1924 into Royal Artillery)
- United States – (see History Of The Fifty-Eighth Artillery C.A.C.)

== Image gallery ==
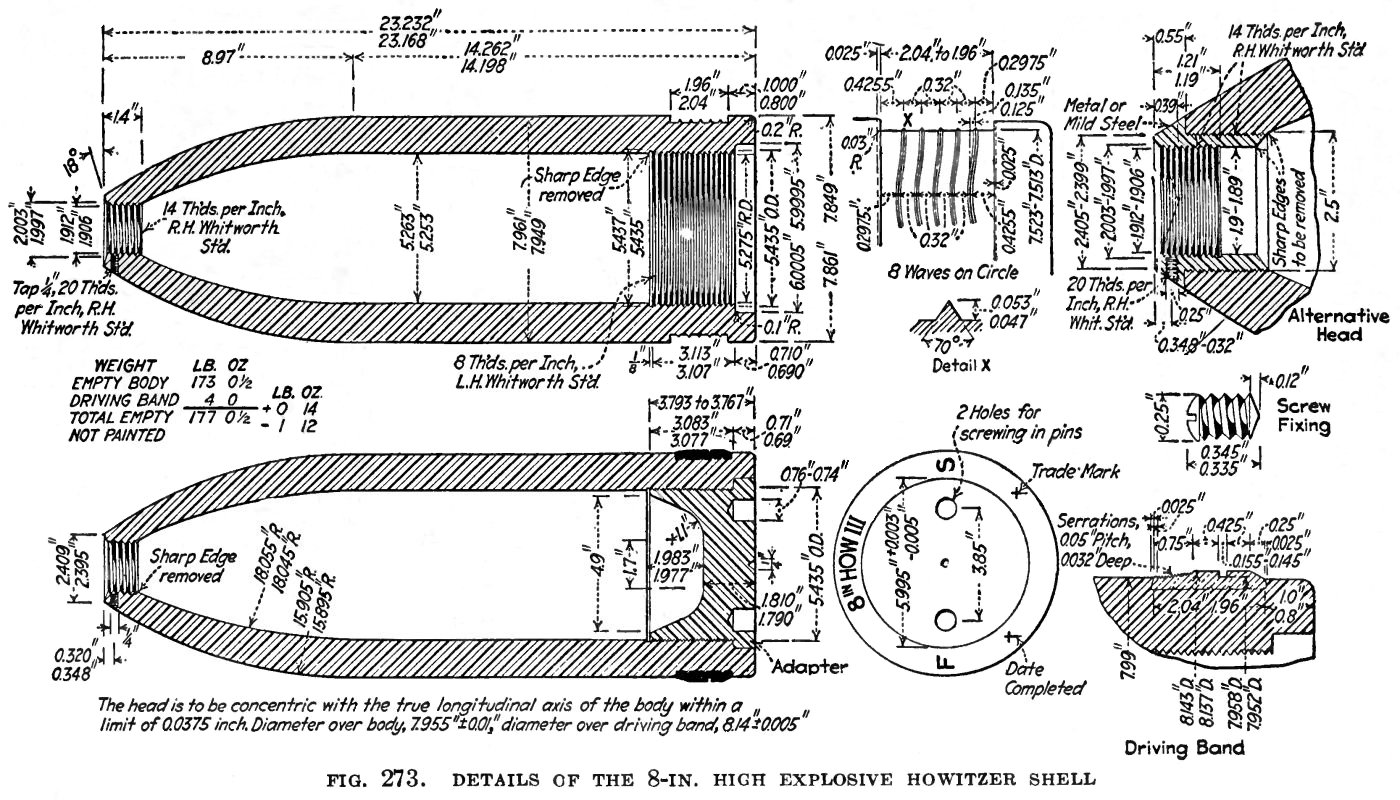
Mk III high-explosive shell

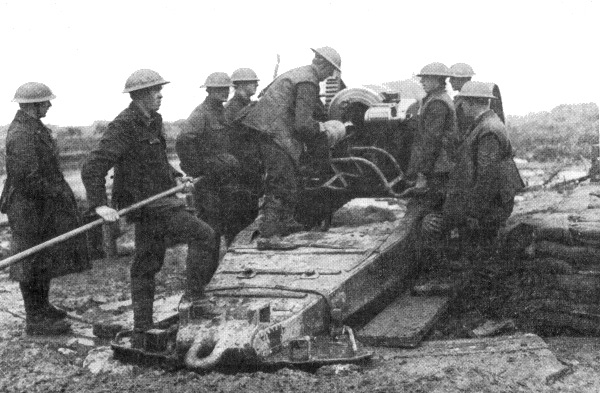
Vickers 8-inch howitzer being loaded, Western Front, 1917

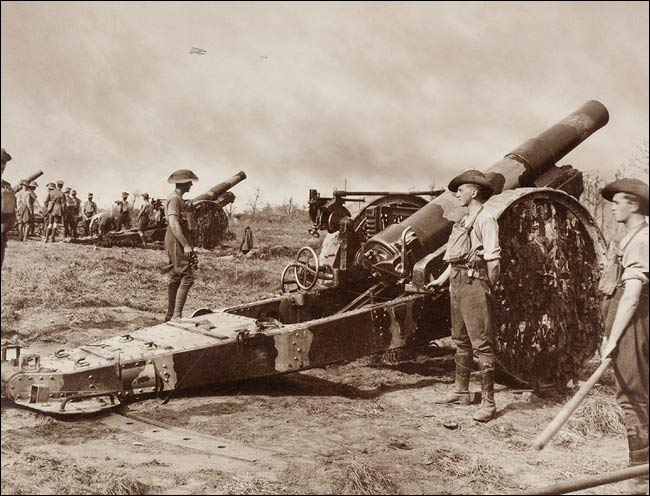
howitzers of Australian 54th Siege Artillery Battery, Western Front, 1917

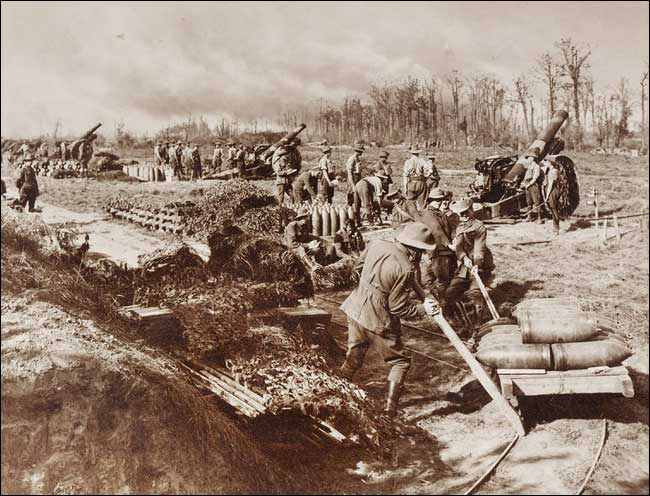
bringing up shells by light rail for the howitzers of Australian 54th Siege Artillery Battery, Western Front, 1917

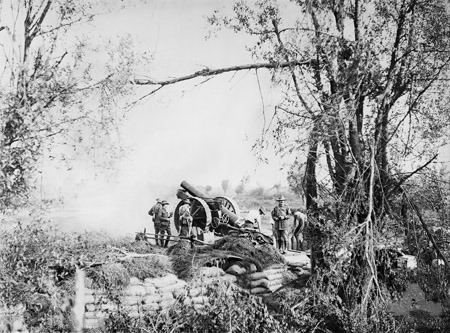
A gun not on Vickers platform, has scotches behind wheels to steady it

== Surviving examples ==
- National Defence College Military Museum, Helsinki Finland
- Artillery Museum, Hämeenlinna, Finland
- Mk VIII at Canadian War Museum, Ottawa, Canada
- Additional weapons are reportedly displayed in the United Kingdom and Russia

== See also ==
- List of howitzers
- United States home front during World War I

=== Weapons of comparable role, performance and era ===
- 21 cm Mörser 16 – German equivalent
- 220 mm TR mle 1915/1916 – French equivalent

== Bibliography ==
Published references

- Dale Clarke, British Artillery 1914–1919. Heavy Artillery. Osprey Publishing, Oxford, 2005 ISBN 1-84176-788-3
- Crowell, Benedict (1919). America's Munitions 1917–1918. Washington, DC: United States Government Publishing Office.
- General Sir Martin Farndale, History of the Royal Regiment of Artillery. Western Front 1914–18. London: Royal Artillery Institution, 1986 ISBN 1-870114-00-0
- General Sir Martin Farndale, History of the Royal Regiment of Artillery : Forgotten Fronts and the Home Base 1914–18. London:The Royal Artillery Institution, 1988 ISBN 1-870114-05-1
- I.V. Hogg & L.F. Thurston, "British Artillery Weapons & Ammunition 1914–1918". London: Ian Allan Publishing, 1972.
- Handbook of artillery : including mobile, anti-aircraft and trench matériel (1920). United States. Army. Ordnance Dept, May 1920
- Handbook of the Mark VI
- Paulaharju, Jyri (1996). Itsenäisen Suomen kenttätykit 1918–1995. Sotamuseon julkaisuja 1/1996. Military Museum of Finland. ISBN 978-951-25-0811-2.
- British National Archives MUN5/373/9227
- Иванов А.: Артиллерия СССР во Второй мировой войне; Нева 2003; Санкт-Петербург

Internet references

- Ross Mallett, AIF 1914–1918 Artillery
- 8 inch Howitzer Mk VI–VIII at Landships
- Joe Hartwell, Defeating the Hun. History of United States Army Coast Artillery Corps During World War One.
- Joe Hartwell, "8-inch British Howitzer" US-built versions
- History Of The Fifty-Eighth Artillery C.A.C.
- Finnish Army 1918–1945. 203 mm H/17 Howitzer
- Om den engelske 8-tommers haubits 1915–1940 (Danish)
