= 41st Field Battery, Royal Australian Artillery =

Australian military unit

41 Field Battery, Royal Australian Artillery
- Active: 1916 – present
- Country: Australia
- Branch: Australian Army
- Type: Artillery
- Role: close fire support
- Garrison/HQ: Southport, Queensland; Ipswich
- Engagements: lua Copy code: World War I; Western Front; Middle Eastern theatre of World War I; Sinai and Palestine campaign

41 Field Battery, Royal Australian Artillery was formally raised in Egypt during March 1916 for service with the 11th Field Artillery Brigade, part of 4th Division Artillery. Today 41st Field Battery is one of 4 batteries that make up the 1st Field Regiment, part of 7 Brigade.

== History ==
During World War I 41st Field Battery took part in action in Egypt, Sinai and on the Western Front. The battery was disbanded at the end of the war.

On 1 May 1948, a sub-unit battery of 3 Composite Anti-Aircraft Regiment with 40 mm Bofors anti-aircraft guns and searchlights was raised at Southport, Queensland. In July 1960, the anti-aircraft era ended as the battery was re-organised as 41st Field Battery as part of 11th Field Regiment equipped with 25 pounder guns. Since then the battery has been equipped with the 105 mm L5 pack howitzers in 1965, 105 mm M2A2 towed howitzers in 1973, and finally the British-designed 105 mm L118/L119 Hamel gun in July 1992.

In 1995, 41 Battery achieved the honour of being presented the Mount Schank Challenge Trophy. This trophy is presented to the most proficient Army Reserve Field or Medium Battery on a biennial basis.

On 1 May 1997, as result of the restructuring of the Army, 41st Field Battery came under command of 1st Field Regiment. From this date 14 Field Battery, also part of 11 Field Regiment and based at Ipswich, was merged with 41 Field Battery. Artillery in Ipswich first came about in 1866 when the 2nd Battery of the Queensland Volunteers was raised in Ipswich and has remained in existence ever since.

Today the battery forms an important part of the Australian Army and is equipped with the British designed 105 mm L118/L119 Hamel gun and provides close support fire to the Army.

- The Battery was re-equipped with the M198 Medium Howitzer in April 2008 and will now operate as a Medium Battery in 1 Field Regiment. The battery's Hamel guns were redistributed to other units that man the 105mm light guns.
- Early 2010 the Battery was then changed back to the L118/L119 105-mm gun.
- in 2010 the battery introduced 25th/49th Battalion, Royal Queensland Regiment, to the base.
