= 2nd Siege Artillery Battery (Australia) =

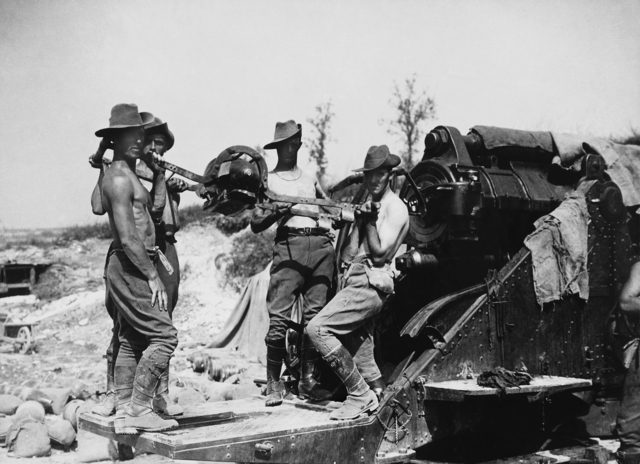
Gunners of 55th Siege Artillery Battery about to load their 9.2 inch howitzer, circa. July 1916

2nd Siege Artillery Battery was formed in Victoria during April 1915. The battery departed Melbourne on 17 July 1915 and served on the Western Front during World War I.

The battery along with the 1st Siege Artillery Battery made up the 1st Siege Artillery Brigade. 2nd Siege Artillery Battery was renamed the 55th Siege Artillery Battery on 28 September 1915. The battery was equipped first with four BL 9.2-inch howitzers and then 6 from July 1917. In March 1918 the battery was assigned to the Australian Corps Heavy Artillery and resumed its original title.

== Gallery ==
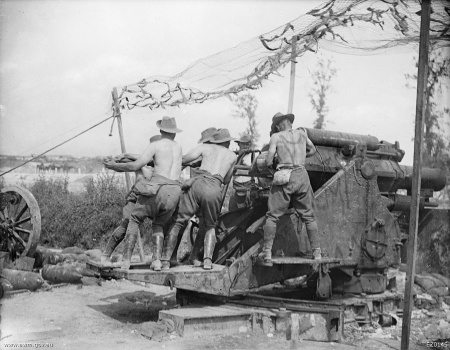
Ramming home the shell, Somme, July 1916

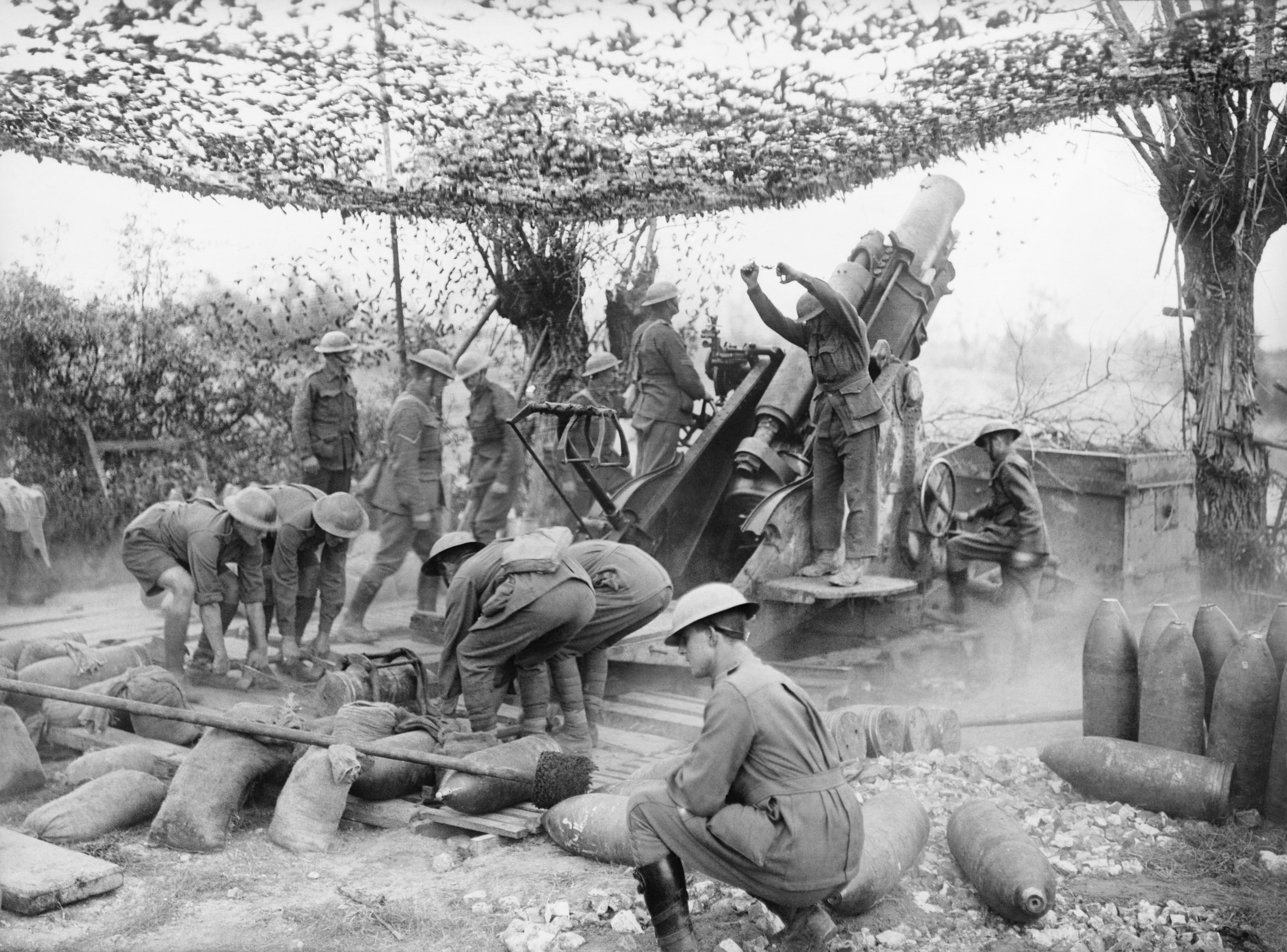
Firing near Voormezeele, Third Battle of Ypres, 13 September 1917

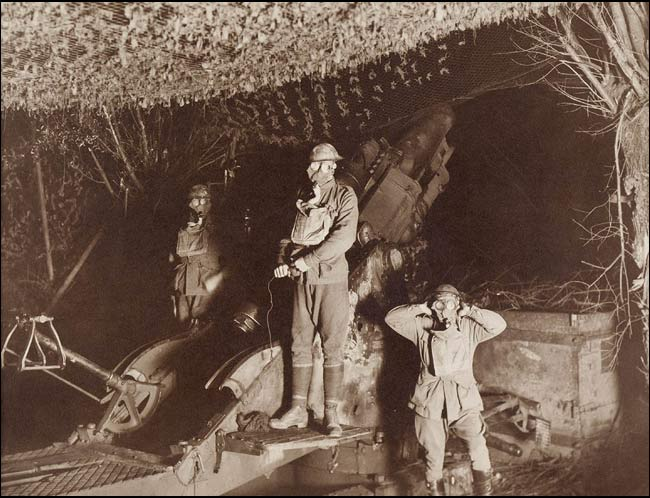
Gunners in gas masks

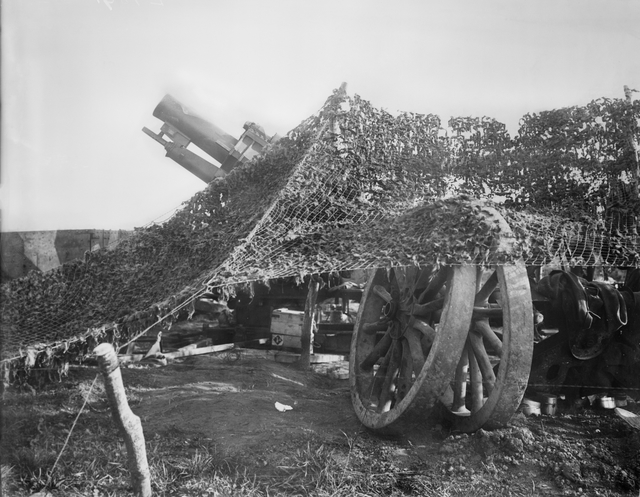
Camouflaged howitzer, Third Battle of Ypres, 1917

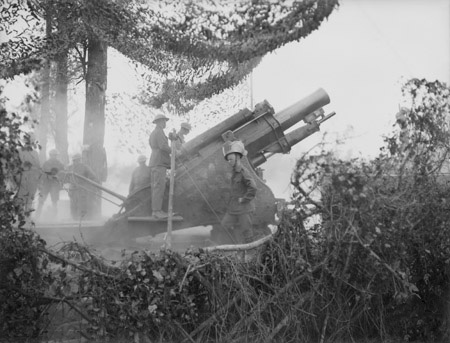
In action near Voormezeele, September 1917

== See also ==
- Australian Army Artillery Units, World War I
