= Sydney Herring =

Australian general

Sydney Charles Edgar Herring
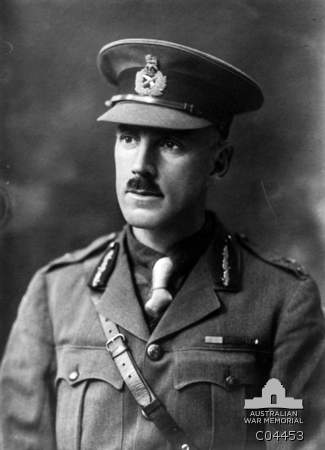
- Brigadier General Sydney Herring c. 1918–1919
- Born: 8 October 1881; Gladesville, New South Wales
- Died: 27 May 1951 (aged 69); Killara, New South Wales
- Military career
- Allegiance: Australian Army
- Service years: 1904–1946
- Rank: Brigadier General
- Commands: 5th Brigade (1926–30); 10th Brigade (1920–21); 13th Brigade (1918–19); 3rd Training Battalion (1917–18); No. 4 Training Group (1917); 45th Battalion (1916–17, 1918); 13th Battalion (1915–16)
- Conflicts: First World War; Gallipoli campaign; Landing at Anzac Cove; Battle of Hill 60; Western Front; Battle of Pozières; Battle of Bullecourt; Battle of Messines; Hundred Days Offensive; Second World War
- Awards: Companion of the Order of St Michael and St George; Distinguished Service Order; Colonial Auxiliary Forces Officers' Decoration; Mentioned in Despatches (5); Officer of the Legion of Honour (France); Croix de Guerre (France)
- Other work: Unsuccessfully ran for Australian Senate

Brigadier General Sydney Charles Edgar Herring, CMG, DSO, VD (8 October 1881 – 27 May 1951) was an Australian Army colonel and temporary brigadier general who fought with distinction during the First World War. He retired in 1946 as an honorary brigadier.

== Early life and career ==
Sydney Charles Edgar Herring was born in Gladesville, a suburb of Sydney on 8 October 1881. After a public school education he became a real estate agent.

Herring was commissioned as a second lieutenant in the 1st Australian Infantry Battalion on 26 March 1904 and promoted to lieutenant on 1 March 1906. With the introduction of universal military training in 1911 he became area officer for Drummoyne and was promoted to captain on 4 January 1911, he transferred to the 21st Infantry on 1 July 1912.

== First World War ==
Herring was appointed to the Australian Imperial Force on 4 October 1914 with the rank of captain in the 13th Infantry Battalion. The battalion left Sydney on 22 December 1914 for Egypt, where Herring was promoted to major and given command of 'D' Company on 1 February 1915. The 13th Battalion landed at Anzac Cove on the evening of 25 April 1915. Ordered to take his company up to Russell's Top and link up with the New Zealanders, Herring and his men climbed the thick scrub opposite Pope's Hill. After taking heavy casualties Herring decided to pull back his line a bit. By the end of the action Herring had retreated back into Monash Valley.

When the Turks broke through the line into Quinn's Post on 29 May 1915, the temporary post commander, Lieutenant Colonel Harold Pope, ordered Herring to make a counterattack, which he fully expected would be extremely costly. Just as Herring was about to order the charge, there was a sudden burst of enemy fire, which abruptly almost ceased. Herring gave the word and his men charged across the open and made it practically unscathed, their attack having coincided with a Turkish assault further down the line and in a location where the Turkish machine gunners could not fire without hitting their own men. The remaining Turks in the post eventually surrendered.

Herring was slightly wounded on 17 May 1915 but remained on duty. On 27 June 1915, he assumed acting command of the 13th Infantry Battalion after the battalion commander, Major Durrant was evacuated sick. Herring was confirmed as commander on 26 August 1915. On 15 October 1915, he was evacuated to Egypt sick, returning to his unit at Anzac on 19 November 1915. For his services at Anzac, Herring was mentioned in despatches.

On 3 January 1916, Herring arrived in Alexandria with the 13th Battalion following the evacuation of Anzac. On 21 February 1916, the battalion was split, half going to form the new 45th Infantry Battalion. Herring took command of the new battalion, while Durrant resumed command of the old. Unfortunately, the new battalions soon had to absorb large numbers of men unwanted by the old battalions and left behind when they moved to France. On 12 March 1916, he became a temporary lieutenant colonel. He was promoted to the rank on 24 June 1916.

The 45th Battalion departed Alexandria on 2 June 1916, arriving at Marseille on 8 June. In August, the battalion was committed to the fighting at Pozières, losing 448 men on its first tour. For his leadership at Pozières, Herring was mentioned in dispatches and awarded the Distinguished Service Order (DSO). At Messines in June 1917, the battalion lost 568 men in pillbox fighting on the Oosttaverne Line. Herring, who had ordered repeated attacks on pillboxes that his men could not capture, was again mentioned in dispatches. On 24 September 1917 he became a brevet major in the AMF.

On 7 October 1917, Herring took over command of No. 4 Training Group in England. This group was responsible for training the brigade's reinforcements. The group was abolished on 8 November 1917, and Herring assumed responsibility for the 3rd Training Battalion. On 7 May 1918, he returned to France where he resumed command of the 45th Battalion. On 26 June 1918 he became commander of the 13th Infantry Brigade and was promoted to colonel and temporary brigadier general on 30 June 1918. The brigade played an important part in the final campaign under his leadership. He was mentioned in despatches for the fourth time and made a Companion of the Order of St Michael and St George (CMG) on 3 June 1919.

== Post-war ==
Herring resumed his career as real estate agent, and ran unsuccessfully for a seat in the New South Wales Legislative Assembly as a Nationalist candidate at the 1920 election for Ryde. He was one of three candidates for the Nationalist nomination for a casual vacancy for the Senate in 1924, however the Nationalist Party decided not to nominate a candidate.

He was placed on the retired list in 1946 with the honorary rank of brigadier. For many years he led the 4th Division in Sydney's Anzac Day parades. He died at the age of 69 on 27 May 1951 and was cremated with full military honours.

and for the Senate as a Nationalist in 1924.

== See also ==
- List of Australian generals
