= Edward Francis Lynch =

Australian writer

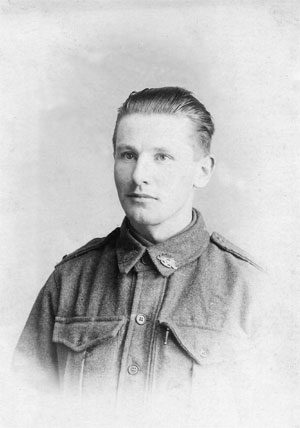
- Lynch in 1917
- Born: 7 August 1897; Bourke, New South Wales
- Died: 12 September 1980 (aged 83)
- Military career
- Allegiance: Australia
- Branch: Australian Army
- Service years: 1916–1918; 1942–1945
- Rank: Major
- Unit: 45th Battalion
- Commands: NSW Jungle Training School
- Conflicts: First World War; Western Front; Battle of Morval; Battle of Flers-Courcelette; Battle of Messines; Battle of Passchendaele; Second Battle of Villers-Bretonneux; Battle of Hamel; Second World War
- Other work: Teacher

Edward Francis Lynch (7 August 1897 – 12 September 1980) was a soldier in the Australian Imperial Force who saw action in the First World War on the Western Front between 1916 and 1919.

Following his return to Australia, Lynch wrote about his war experiences. However, this writing was not published until a quarter of century after his death, in the form of a novel titled Somme Mud (2006). The experiences of its protagonist, "Nulla", appear to be closely based on those of Lynch and his comrades in arms.

== Pre-war ==
Lynch grew up and lived in Bathurst, New South Wales, recording a Perthville, Bathurst address when he enlisted on 5 April 1916 aged 18. He sailed in August 1916 on board the ship Wiltshire in the 12th Brigade reinforcements who arrived in France in the weeks after the Australian Imperial Force (AIF) suffered tremendous casualties at Pozières.

== Somme Mud ==
=== Unit and skills ===
The book's editor, military historian Will Davies, asserts that the "Nulla" character is based upon Lynch himself and that Lynch used the device to try to distance himself from the story. Lynchs' record indicates that he saw similar service, including suffering similar injuries to Nulla, although he includes Nulla in well-known battles, such as Villers-Brettoneux, when Lynch himself was recovering from wounds. Nulla's unit is 14 Platoon of D Company of the 45th Battalion (New South Wales) within 12th Brigade of the Australian 4th Division. Nulla's expertise during his service includes his sense of direction and ability to find his way in and around the front line which results in his recurring deployment by his Officers Commanding as a runner or front line guide. He also has qualifications as a Signaller and variously throughout the story is asked to relieve for signalling parties who suffer casualties.

=== Theatre of action ===
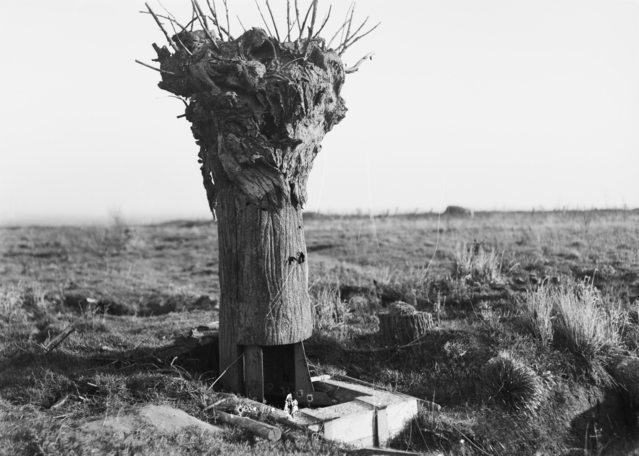
Dummy tree used as an observation post on Hill 63 by Australian troops during the Battle of Messines Ridge

Nulla first sees action at Dernancourt in the latter months of the Battle of the Somme. He describes support and front line service at Gueudecourt and Delville Wood at the time of the Battle of Morval and the Battle of Flers-Courcelette and surviving the horrendous 1916–17 winter in the trenches on the Somme.

Nulla's 45th Battalion was in the Fourth Division's assault on the Hindenburg Line in the First Battle of Bullecourt in April 1917 at Noreuil. In the May they moved to the front in Flanders, Belgium and they saw action on day one (10 June 1917) and throughout the Battle of Messines. Nulla suffered shrapnel wounds in two separate incidents but stayed in the front line and saw action through the summer and autumn at Broodseinde, Ploegsteert Wood, Wambeke, Westhoek and Polygon Wood all theatres of the Battle of Passchendaele. During this period command of the 4th division passed to Maj. Gen. Ewen Sinclair-Maclagan, who inspected Nulla and his mates during the Passchendaele campaign.

On 1 October 1917 at Broodseinde Ridge, Nulla was hit by a mortar and suffered leg injuries. He was repatriated to England for six months, returning to France in March 1918 just in time to be sent to the Somme meet the German spring offensive. He saw action in and around Bailleulmont and Millencourt and was with the 4th Division when Australian and British troops stopped the German advance in hard-fought battles at Dernancourt on the Ancre River, retaking positions the Entente had previously held including the very same Dernancourt trenches Nulla had occupied in 1916.

The repulse of the Spring Offensive marked the turning of the campaign on the Western Front and Nulla's 45th along with the other battalions that made up the 12th Brigade, were sent in April 1918 in support of the 13th Infantry Brigade's counterattack at the Second Battle of Villers-Bretonneux. Nulla was on the front line throughout May 1918 at Villers-Bretonneux.

The 45th then participated in the Battle of Hamel alongside American forces seeing their first action and then stayed around the Hamel area in July 1918. With the Germans in retreat from August in the face of the Hundred Days Offensive, movement and progress began to quicken and the 45th and 48th Battalions pushed through Harbonnieres.

The final activity Nulla's battalion saw was in support at the Battle of Épehy (18 September 1918) and in the front line at the Battle of St. Quentin Canal (29 September 1918). Things quietened considerably throughout October 1918 and although the Armistice was declared on 11 November, the 45th Battalion – at that stage fifty miles behind the front line – were not informed of the war's end until the next day.

The 4th Division stood-by throughout November and December 1918 for duties as part of the Army of Occupation but in February they began to demobilise in order of their tenure since enlistment. Sailing from Devonport, England in May 1919, Nulla was home in Sydney in July.

=== Writing and publication ===
Lynch wrote of his war experiences long-hand filling twenty exercise books in the late 1920s and 1930s. During his time as Commanding Officer of an Australian Jungle Training School in World War II he typed up the manuscript with the aim of having it published. There was insufficient interest at that time and other than some excerpts being published in the RSL magazine Reveille the story remained untold.

The nine-centimetre-thick manuscript remained with Lynch's family and in 2002 his grandson Mike Lynch brought it to the attention of military historian Will Davies who edited it and saw it through to publication by Random House in 2006. The book has become well known and has been favourably compared by Professor Bill Gammage to All Quiet on the Western Front.

The driving theme of mateship is strong throughout the book. The actions of Nulla, Longun, Dark, Snow, Farmer, The Prof, Yacob and Jacko in looking out for each other beyond the omnipresent death and fear are consistently described. But at times Lynch also speaks directly of the meaning of mateship: "No one ever seems to admit that he enlisted out of love of country, or because he thought his loved ones were in danger. Somehow it seems that most of us enlisted because our mates did. That men were driven to enlist by that urging spirit of pulling together that is really mateship undefined. A man enlists because his mates do, not because he wants to bayonet and bomb other men."

Lynch does not lament his lost youth and innocence but in fact during the narrative grows in wisdom and wit whilst evidently developing considerable skills as a professional soldier. But his disdain for the futility of war and his horror at what he witnesses is a continual theme. He often comments on the sadness of the lonely deaths of the young men laid in a land far from home and kin and poignantly quotes the Australian blind poet digger Tom Skeyhill.

== Life after war ==
In 1921, Lynch enrolled at the Sydney Teachers College. He graduated in 1923 and was sent to Goulburn, New South Wales to teach. That same year he married Yvonne Peters and they would have five children together. In 1939, on the outbreak of the Second World War he joined the Militia. In 1942, he transferred to the regular army and became Officer Commanding the New South Wales Jungle Training School near Coffs Harbour. After the war, he returned to teaching until his retirement.
