= John Hines (Australian soldier) =

Australian soldier of World War I

John "Barney" Hines
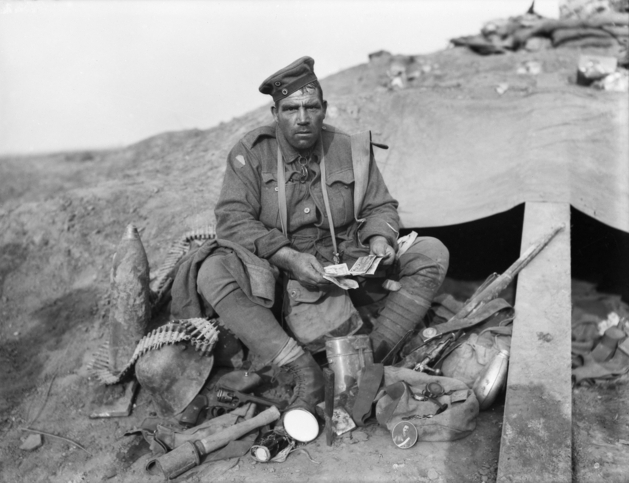
- Private John "Barney" Hines surrounded by German equipment he had looted during the Battle of Polygon Wood in September 1917. He is counting money stolen from prisoners of war, wearing a German Army field cap and sitting amidst German weapons and personal equipment.
- Born: Johannes Heim; 11 October 1878; Liverpool, England
- Died: 28 January 1958 (aged 79); Concord Repatriation Hospital, Sydney
- Burial place: Rookwood Cemetery
- Military career
- Allegiance: United Kingdom; Australia
- Branch: Royal Navy; British Army; Australian Imperial Force (1915–18)
- Service years: 1915–18
- Rank: Private
- Nicknames: "Wild Eye", "Souvenir King"
- Units: King's Liverpool Regiment; 45th Battalion
- Conflicts: Second Boer War; World War I

John "Barney" Hines (1878–1958) was a British-born Australian soldier of World War I, known for his prowess at taking items from German soldiers. Hines was the subject of a famous photo taken by Frank Hurley that depicted him surrounded by German military equipment and money he had looted during the Battle of Polygon Wood in September 1917. This image is among the best-known Australian photographs of the war.

Born in Liverpool, England, in 1878, Hines served in the British Army and Royal Navy, and worked in several occupations. He arrived in Australia in 1915 and volunteered for the Australian Imperial Force in August 1915. Although discharged due to poor health in early 1916, he rejoined in August that year and served on the Western Front from March 1917 to mid-1918, when he was discharged again for health reasons. During his period in France he proved to be an aggressive soldier, and gained fame for the collection of items that he amassed, but was undisciplined when not in combat and frequently punished. After the war, Hines lived in poverty on the outskirts of Sydney until his death in 1958.

== Early life ==
Hines was born Johannes Heim on 11 October 1878 in Liverpool, England to German immigrant parents Jacob and Dora Heim. His father, Jacob Heim, was one of many Germans who emigrated to England to work in the sugar refining industry. Hines married Hannah Maher at Our Lady's Church in Eldon Street, Liverpool in 1899. They had two children together.

He moved to New Zealand in the early 1900s. By the time of his first criminal conviction in New Zealand, in November 1904, he was using the alternate surname Hines. He had a very bad criminal record in New Zealand. After over a decade in New Zealand he moved to Australia. He worked his passage to Australia as a fireman on the ship Somerset under the name J Heim. The ship arrived at Sydney, Australia on 18 August 1915.

== World War I ==
Hines first joined the Australian Imperial Force (AIF) on 24 August 1915, falsely claiming to be 28 years of age. In the year before he joined the Army he had worked as a seaman, engineer and shearer. He was discharged from the AIF as medically unfit on 20 January 1916. On 8 May Hines successfully rejoined the AIF, this time giving an age of 36 years and seven months. By this stage of the war medical requirements were less strict due to the need for reinforcements to make good the AIF's casualties. Hines was assigned to the 45th Battalion and departed Sydney for Europe onboard HMAT A18 Wiltshire on 22 August 1916.

After completing training in England, Hines joined the 45th Battalion on the Western Front in March 1917. In June that year he captured a force of 60 Germans during the Battle of Messines by throwing hand grenades into their pillbox, and was later wounded. He returned to his battalion in time for the Battle of Polygon Wood in September, where Frank Hurley photographed him on 27 September surrounded by the loot he had captured. Hines was an aggressive soldier and it has been claimed that he killed more Germans than any other member of the AIF. Though brave in battle and admired by his fellow soldiers, his behaviour was erratic at times. The wartime commander of the 45th Battalion, Arthur Samuel Allen, described Hines to a journalist in 1938 as "a tower of strength to the battalion ... while he was in the line".

Hines' enthusiasm for collecting German military equipment and German soldiers' personal possessions became well known within and possibly outside of his battalion, and earned him the nickname of "Souvenir King". Although he collected some items from battlefields at Ypres and the Somme region, most were stolen from German prisoners of war. He kept the items he collected for himself, and there are no records of any being handed over to the Australian War Records Section, the AIF unit responsible for collecting items for later display in Australia. Hines sold some of the items he collected to other soldiers, including for alcohol. The photograph of Hines at the Battle of Polygon Wood was published in late 1917 under the title Wild Eye, the souvenir king and became one of the best-known Australian photographs of the war. Many soldiers identified with Hines and were amused by his collection of souvenirs. The photograph was used as propaganda, and a false story developed that the German Kaiser Wilhelm II had become enraged after seeing it.

Away from the front line, Hines developed a record of indiscipline. He was court martialled on nine occasions for drunkenness, impeding military police, forging entries in his pay book and being absent without leave. He also claimed to have been caught burgling the strongroom of a bank in Amiens, though this is not recorded in his Army service record. As a result of these convictions, Hines lost several promotions he had earned for his acts of bravery. He was also fined on several occasions, and the resulting need for money may have been one of the factors that motivated his looting. A member of the 3rd Battalion described Hines as "not normally a weak man but rather one ... uncontrolled". An officer from the 45th Battalion stated after the war that Hines had been "two pains in the neck".

In mid-1918 Hines was discharged from the AIF as being medically unfit due to hemorrhoid problems. He arrived back in Australia on 19 October 1918. While his Army service file records that he was lightly wounded on two occasions, Hines later claimed to have been wounded five times.

== Later years ==
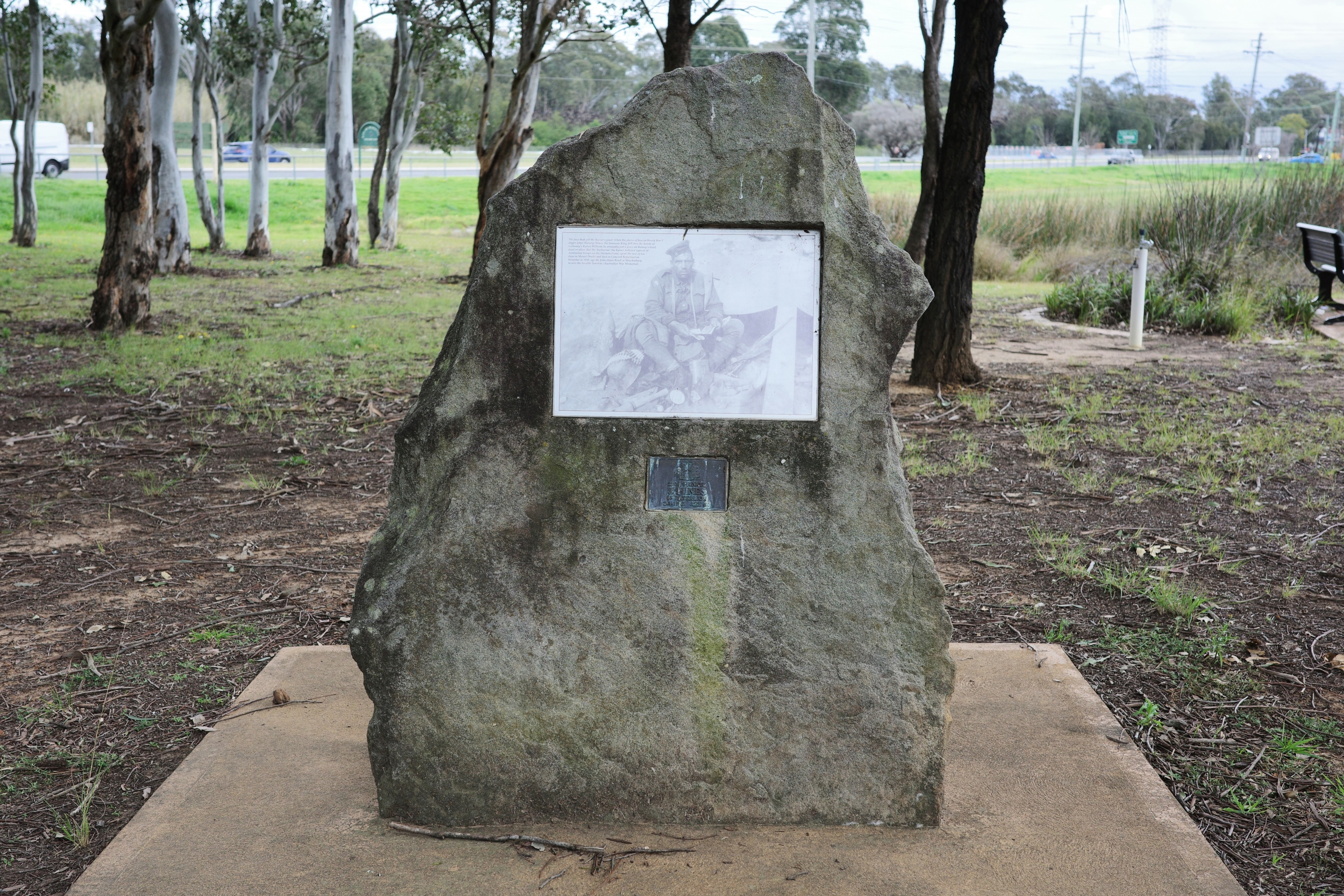
The memorial to John Hines at the Mount Druitt Waterholes Remembrance Garden

Hines was traumatised by his experiences during World War I. For 40 years afterwards he lived in a humpy made of cloth bags near Mount Druitt on the outskirts of Sydney. The humpy was surrounded by a fence on which he hung helmets taken from German soldiers; he became well known to locals, though school children were afraid of him. Hines was unable to find consistent work, and lived on his Army pension as well as income from odd jobs and selling his souvenirs. He gained renewed fame when the photo of him at Polygon Wood was displayed at the temporary Australian War Museum in Sydney (the predecessor of the Australian War Memorial) from 1933, and several newspapers and magazines aimed at former servicemen published profiles of him. An article in the Returned Sailors and Soldiers Imperial League of Australia's magazine Reveille in 1934 highlighted Hines' desperate living conditions and stated that he had been unemployed for four years. Several former soldiers sent money to him in response to this article. Hines' pension was also doubled, though this income made him ineligible for relief work during the Great Depression. Despite his poverty, Hines travelled to Concord Repatriation Hospital each week to donate a suitcase of vegetables from his garden to the former soldiers being treated there.

Hines told a journalist in June 1939 that he was seeking to join the Militia and hoped to fight in another war. He attempted to enlist in the military during World War II, despite being in his 60s, but was rejected. An article published in The Nepean Times during 1943 claimed that Hines had attempted to stow away on a troop ship in 1940, but was found and sent ashore before the vessel sailed.

On 28 January 1958 Hines died at Concord Repatriation Hospital. He was buried in Rookwood Cemetery in a grave which was unmarked until 1971, when the Mount Druitt sub-branch of the Returned Services League of Australia paid for a headstone. The Blacktown City Council also renamed the street on which he lived in the suburb of Minchinbury to John Hines Avenue, and a monument commemorating him was built at the nearby Mount Druitt Waterholes Remembrance Garden in 2002.

A large version of the famous photograph of Hines was accorded a prominent position in the Australian War Memorial's permanent building in Canberra after it opened in 1941. The photo was also included in the 2014 redevelopment of the Memorial's permanent World War I exhibition. In a short biography of Hines published in 2002, historian Peter Stanley commented that "'Wild Eye's' bravado conceals a deeper pathos" and he "was a man whose skills in fighting were needed and whose knack for souveniring was admired, but he had few gifts that a peaceful society valued".
