= 45th Battalion (Australia) =

Australian Army infantry battalion

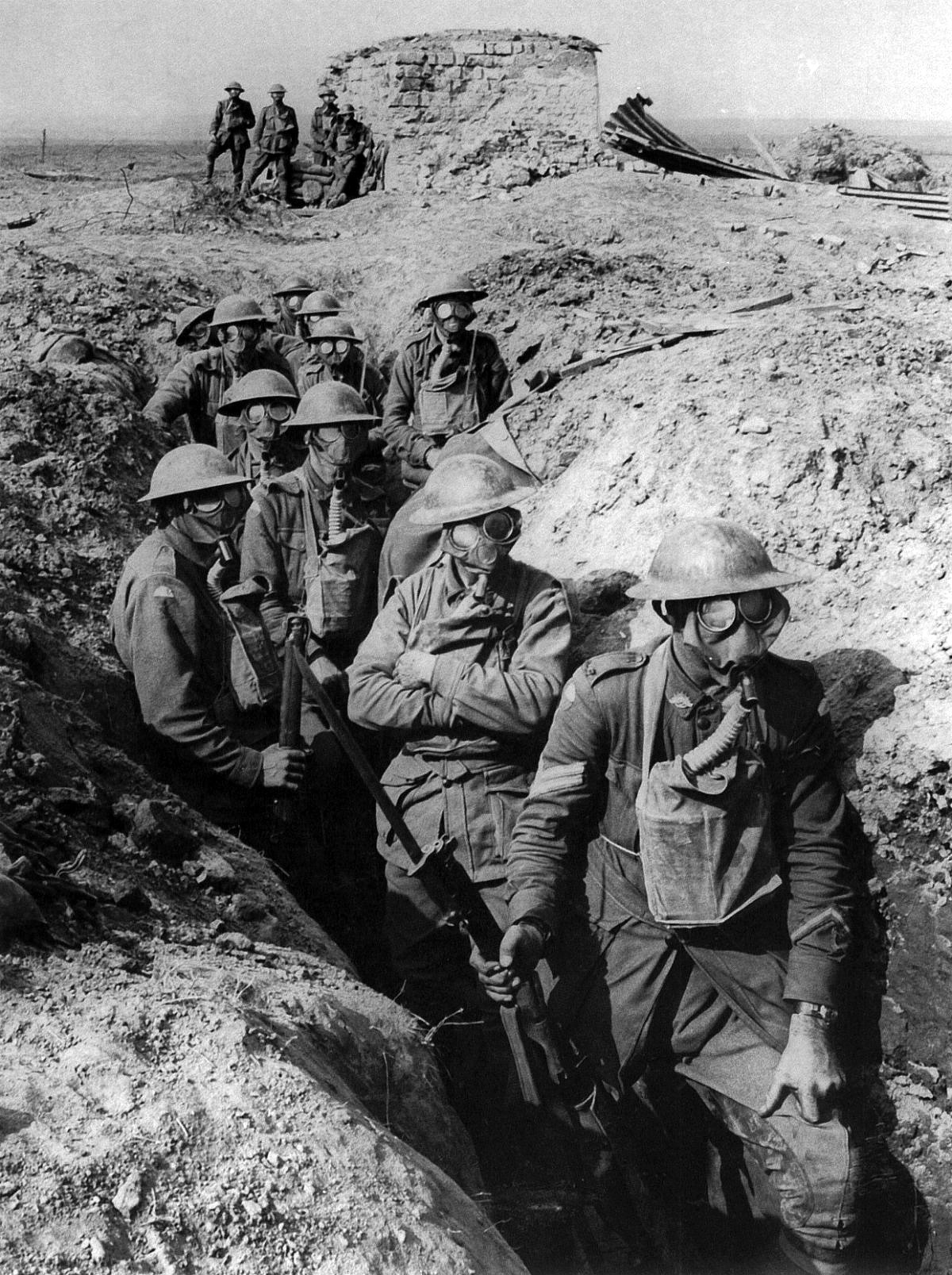
- Members of the 45th Battalion wearing gas masks, at "Garter Point" near Zonnebeke, Belgium 27 September 1917
- Active: 1916–1919; 1921–1942; 1948–1960
- Country: Australia
- Branch: Australian Army
- Type: Infantry
- Size: ~900–1,000 men (Note: During World War II the authorised strength of Australian infantry battalions was 1,023. At the start of World War II, it was around 900.)
- Part of: 12th Brigade, 4th Division
- Motto: Quo Fata Vocant (Whither Destinies Summon)
- Colours: Light blue over dark blue
- March: Men of Harlech
- Engagements: World War I: Western Front

Commanders
- Notable commanders: Sydney Herring

Insignia
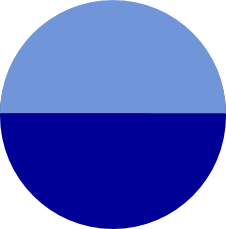
- Unit colour patch

The 45th Battalion was an infantry battalion of the Australian Army. Raised for service during World War I, the battalion served in the trenches on the Western Front in France and Belgium from mid-1916 until the end of hostilities in November 1918. Following this, it was disbanded in May 1919. Later, in 1921, the battalion was re-raised as a part-time unit of the Citizens Force, based in New South Wales. The battalion remained on the order of battle until 1942, when it was merged with the 1st Battalion as part of a force reduction that was undertaken at that time in response to an over mobilisation of the Australian military in the early part of World War II. In 1948, the battalion was re-raised again and remained on the order of battle until 1960 when it was absorbed into the Royal New South Wales Regiment.

== History ==
=== World War I ===
The 45th Battalion was originally raised on 2 March 1916 as part of the expansion of the Australian Imperial Force (AIF) in Egypt, which was undertaken following the completion of the Gallipoli campaign. As part of this process, new battalions were formed from experienced cadre personnel that were drawn from the veteran battalions of the 1st Division and the New Zealand and Australian Division, along with freshly trained recruits that were transferred from Australia. Due to its association with the 13th Battalion, which provided the majority of the 45th's experienced personnel, the 45th Battalion consisted primarily of volunteers from New South Wales. Under the command of Lieutenant Colonel Sydney Herring, who had formerly commanded the 13th Battalion, the 45th Battalion was assigned to the 12th Brigade, 4th Division. After completing training in Egypt, the battalion was transferred to the Western Front in mid-1916. During the following two and a half years, the battalion fought in a number of major battles in France and Belgium.

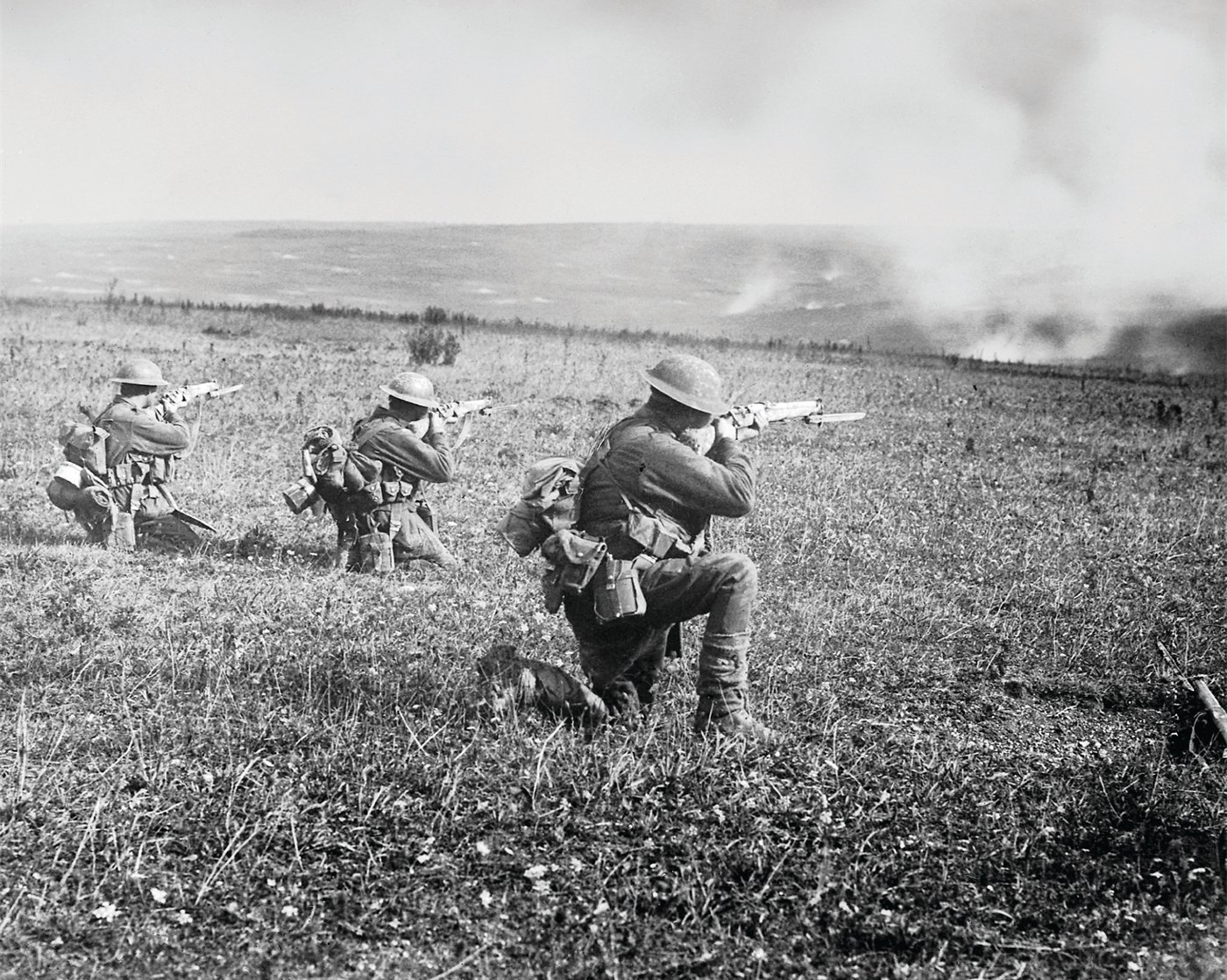
Members of the 45th Battalion in action at the Battle of the Hindenburg Line, during September 1918. (The man kneeling on the far left is believed to be Private Edward Lynch)

Its first major battle came at Pozières in August, where it undertook a defensive role, holding ground that had been captured by the Australian 2nd Division earlier in the fighting. Later, after spending a period behind the lines near Ypres in Belgium, during the Battle of Bullecourt the battalion was held back in reserve and did not take part in the fighting. In mid-1917, it suffered heavy casualties during the Battles of Messines and Passchendaele. In March 1918, during the German spring offensive, the battalion repelled repeated attacks that were concentrated upon breaking through the Allied line at Dernancourt. Later, when the Allies launched their own offensive, the Hundred Days Offensive, the 45th Battalion was heavily involved in the fighting that began on 8 August 1918, during which time it was credited with capturing a large number of German soldiers, as well as a number of artillery pieces and machine-guns. Its last major action was the Battle of the Hindenburg Line, on 18 September, when it seized outposts of the Hindenburg Line, around Le Verguier.

Following this, the units of the Australian Corps were withdrawn from the line for reorganisation. Consequently, they did not take part in any further fighting before the armistice came into effect on 11 November 1918. Following the end of hostilities, the demobilisation process began and the battalion's numbers fell as men were repatriated to Australia. Finally, on 2 May 1919, the battalion was disbanded. During the course of the war the battalion lost 688 men killed and 1,707 wounded. Members of the battalion received the following decorations: four Distinguished Service Orders with one Bar, one Officer of the Order of the British Empire, 28 Military Crosses with one Bar, 14 Distinguished Conduct Medals, 140 Military Medals with seven Bars, six Meritorious Service Medals, 37 Mentions in Despatches and five foreign awards.

The 45th Battalion's contribution to Australia's effort during the war was recognised by the awarding of 16 battle honours. In 2006, a critically acclaimed memoir by Edward Lynch (1898–1980), concerning his experiences as a private in 14 Platoon, D Company, 45th Battalion was published for the first time, under the title Somme Mud.

=== Inter-war years and World War II ===
In 1921, the decision was made to perpetuate the units of the AIF by reorganising the units of the Citizens Force so that they adopted the numerical designations of their related AIF units as well as their battle honours, traditions and unit colour patches. As a result of this decision, the 45th Battalion was re-raised in New South Wales. Headquartered at Arncliffe, the battalion was assigned to the 9th Brigade, 2nd Division. Upon formation, the newly raised battalion drew personnel from the 2nd and 5th Battalions of the 45th Infantry Regiment. Territorial designations were adopted in 1927 and the 45th Battalion assumed the title of the "St George Regiment"; its motto – Quo Fata Vocant – was also approved at this time. Initially, the Citizens Force was maintained through the compulsory training scheme, but after 1922 the battalion's authorised establishment was reduced in response to large-scale budget cuts that occurred following the Washington Naval Treaty. In 1930, following the election of Scullin Labor government, the compulsory training scheme was suspended. The Citizens Force was renamed the "Militia" at this time and became a volunteer-only force. This had the effect of reducing the manpower available and many units were amalgamated or disbanded at this time as their numbers were reduced, although the 45th Battalion avoided this fate. In 1934, the battalion was allied with The Welsh Regiment.

After the outbreak of World War II in 1939, Militia units were expanded through the re-establishment of conscription and took part in home defence duties and training. In April 1941, the 45th Battalion was transferred to the 28th Brigade, 1st Division. In December 1941, following Japan's entry into the war, the Militia were called up for full-time duty and the units of the 1st Division were tasked with the defence of the Sydney area. In February 1942, the battalion was transferred again, this time to the 31st Brigade, 1st Division. By mid-1942, an over mobilisation of Australia's military forces had resulted in a manpower shortage in the Australian economy. In order to rectify this situation, the Australian government decided to amalgamate and disband a number of units from the Militia in order to free up their personnel and return them to the civilian workforce. As a result, in late August 1942, the 45th Battalion was disbanded. Then in September 1942 the battalion was merged with the 1st Battalion to form the 1st/45th Battalion. In 1944, that battalion was also dissolved, having not deployed overseas.

=== Post war ===
In 1948, Australia's part-time military force was re-raised under the guise of the Citizens Military Force (CMF). This force was formed on a reduced establishment of just two divisions. The 45th Battalion was re-raised on 1 April 1948 under the command of Lieutenant Colonel Paul Cullen. Once again it was assigned to the 2nd Division, but was attached at brigade level to the 14th Brigade. During this time it also took on the role of a machine-gun battalion. Due to its links with Sydney, the newly raised 45th Battalion was closely associated with the disbanded 2/1st Battalion, a Second Australian Imperial Force unit, from where a large majority of the 45th Battalion's officers were drawn following the war. The battalion's regimental march, Men of Harlech was authorised in 1953.

Initially the post-war CMF was maintained on a voluntary basis, however, in 1951 the compulsory training scheme was reintroduced. The scheme was suspended in 1959, however, and this led to a significant decrease in the strength of many units. The following year, the Australian Army adopted the Pentropic divisional structure and a large-scale reorganisation of the CMF structure followed. As a result, a number of infantry battalions amalgamated or disbanded altogether as the regionally based single battalion regiments were replaced by six new multi-battalion State-based regiments. As part of this change, the 45th Battalion was subsumed into the Royal New South Wales Regiment, providing the 3rd Battalion's 'A' and Support Companies. The battalion's colours were laid up at St Paul's Church at Kogarah. The battalion's battle honours are perpetuated by the 4th/3rd Battalion, Royal New South Wales Regiment.

== Battle honours ==
The 45th Battalion received the following battle honours:

- Somme 1916–18, Pozières, Bullecourt, Messines 1917, Ypres 1917, Menin Road, Polygon Wood, Passchendaele, Ancre 1918, Hamel, Amiens, Albert 1918, Hindenburg Line, Épehy, France and Flanders 1916–18, Egypt 1915–16.

== See also ==
- John Hines (Australian soldier)

== Notes ==
Footnotes

Citations
