= List of Australian military memorials =

Most Australian towns and cities have a World War I or ANZAC, and/or World War II memorial or Cenotaph.

Listing and photographs are by state and territory:

== Australian Capital Territory - Canberra ==
| Memorial name | Location | Date established/ dedicated | Image | Honours | Notes |
|---|---|---|---|---|---|
| ACT Memorial | London Circuit, Civic | 10 August 2006 | | Men and women associated with the Australian Capital Territory who served in a number of conflicts and peacekeeping missions throughout the world. | |
| Australian Army Memorial, Canberra | Anzac Parade, Canberra | | | The two central figures represent two Australian soldiers facing the east and the rising sun, and represent the importance of support and comradeship represented in the Australian term, 'mates'. | |
| Australian Merchant Navy Memorial | Kings Park, Canberra | 7 October 1990 | | Australian Merchant Navy | |
| Australian Peacekeeping Memorial | Southern end of Anzac Parade | 14 September 2017 | | | |
| Australian War Memorial | Treloar Crescent, Campbell, Canberra | 1941 | | Australia's national memorial to the members of its armed forces and supporting organisations who have died or participated in wars involving the Commonwealth of Australia, and some conflicts involving personnel from the Australian colonies prior to Federation. The memorial includes an extensive national military museum. | |
| Boer War Memorial, Canberra | Anzac Parade, Canberra | 31 May 2017 | | Military history of Australia during the Second Boer War, 1899–1902. | |
| Korean War Memorial, Canberra | Anzac Parade, Canberra | 17 September 1999 | | Australian individuals that served and died in the Korean War under the command of the United Nations. | |
| Royal Australian Air Force Memorial | Anzac Parade, Canberra | 15 March 1973 | | 50th anniversary of the formation of the RAAF (initially as the Australian Air Force, the "Royal" prefix being added in August 1921), and the service of members of the RAAF. | |
| Rats of Tobruk Memorial | Anzac Parade, Canberra | 12 April 1983 | | The German siege of the Libyan Mediterranean Sea port town of Tobruk began on 10 April 1941. After desperate fighting, most of the Australian forces were relieved by October 1941. However, the town was continuously contested until the Allied victory at El Alamein in 1942. | |
| Royal Australian Navy Memorial | Anzac Parade, Canberra | 3 March 1986 | | The sailors who have served to protect Australia. | |
| Vietnam Forces National Memorial | Anzac Parade, Canberra | 3 October 1992 | | The 50,000 Australian Army, Royal Australian Navy, and Royal Australian Air Force and associated personnel who served in Vietnam during the Vietnam War. | |

== New South Wales ==
| Memorial name | Location | Date established/ dedicated | Image | Honours | Notes |
|---|---|---|---|---|---|
| Batemans Bay Vietnam War Memorial | Batemans Bay | 2005 | | Vietnam War (1962–1973) | |
| Batlow War Memorial | Batlow | | | | RSL garden and memorial with Bofors 40/60 anti-aircraft gun |
| Berrima War Memorial | Berrima | | | | |
| Braidwood War Memorial | Braidwood | | | | |
| Bundarra War Memorial | Bundarra | | | | |
| Bungendore War Memorial | Bungendore | | | | |
| Chatswood Memorial Garden | Chatswood | | | | |
| Chatswood Memorial Garden | Chatswood | | | World War II | |
| Culcain War Memorial | Culcairn | | | | |
| Forbes Boer War Memorial | Forbes | | | Boer War | |
| Forbes War Memorial | Forbes | | | | |
| Rolls of Honour | School of the Arts Hall, Glen Oak | | | World War I | |
| | Greta | | | | |
| | Gundagai | | | | |
| | Gundaroo | | | | |
| | Jugiong | | | | |
| | Milton | | | | |
| | Mittagong | | | | |
| | Mittagong RSL | | | | |
| | Narrabri | | | | |
| | Nerriga | | | | |
| | Parkes | | | | |
| Anzac Memorial | Hyde Park, Sydney central business district | 1934 | | Originally World War I, now all conflicts. | |
| Martin Place Cenotaph | Martin Place, Sydney | 1929 | A side view of the Martin Place Cenotaph | | |
| | Tarago | | | | |
| | Thornton | 1978 | | | |
| War Memorial | Thornton | | | | |
| District Roll of Honour | Tumbarumba | | | | |
| District Volunteers South African War 1899–1902 | Tumbarumba | | | Boer War | |
| Memorial Hall | Tumbarumba | | | | |
| Union Jack Gold Mining Company Memorial | Approx. 5 km (3.1 mi) north of Tumbarumba | | | World War I | |
| | Tweed Heads | | | | |
| | on the Clarence River, Ulmarra | | | | |
| Victory Memorial Gardens Arch | Wagga Wagga | | | | |
| | Wellington | | | | |
| Yininmadyemi - Thou didst let fall | Hyde Park, Sydney | | | | |

=== Memorials for people ===
| Person memorialised | Location | Date established/ dedicated | Image | Notes |
|---|---|---|---|---|
| Private Patrick Joseph Bugden VC | Alstonville | | | |

== Northern Territory ==
| Memorial name | Location | Date established/ dedicated | Image | Honours | Notes |
|---|---|---|---|---|---|
| Darwin Bombing Memorial | Darwin, Northern Territory | | | Commemorating the 1942 bombing of Darwin | |

== Queensland ==
The Queensland War Memorial Register is maintained by the Government of Queensland in collaboration with local government authorities in Queensland and the Returned and Services League of Australia. It was established in 2008 and, as at 14 November 2017, lists 1398 war memorials in Queensland.

The war memorials in Queensland take many forms but are predominantly either outdoor monuments, memorial buildings or memorial components within other structures. Notable war memorials include:

- Anzac Square, Brisbane
- Anning Monument
- Anzac Avenue Memorial Trees
- Anzac Memorial Park, Townsville
- Apple Tree Creek War Memorial
- Aramac War Memorial
- Atherton War Memorial
- Baralaba, Queensland
- Barcaldine Shire Hall
- Barcaldine War Memorial Clock
- Beaudesert War Memorial
- Berry and MacFarlane Monument
- Boer War Memorial, Allora
- Boer War Memorial, Gatton
- Boer War Veterans Memorial Kiosk and Lissner Park
- Boonah War Memorial
- Booval War Memorial
- Brooweena War Memorial
- Bulimba Memorial Park
- Bundaberg War Memorial
- Bundaberg War Nurses Memorial
- Cairns War Memorial
- Cardwell Divisional Board Hall
- Caskey Monument
- Charleville War Memorial
- Chinchilla Digger Statue
- Cleveland War Memorials
- Coorparoo School of Arts and RSL Memorial Hall
- Cooyar War Memorial
- Coronation Lamp War Memorial
- Cunnamulla War Memorial Fountain
- Dalby War Memorial and Gates
- Enoggera Memorial Hall
- Esk War Memorial
- Eumundi War Memorial Trees
- Evelyn Scrub War Memorial
- Finch Hatton War Memorial
- First World War Honour Board, Lands Administration Building
- First World War Honour Board, National Australia Bank (308 Queen Street)
- Forest Hill War Memorial
- Gair Park
- Gayndah War Memorial
- Goombungee War Memorial
- Goomeri Hall of Memory
- Goomeri War Memorial Clock
- Goondiwindi War Memorial
- Graceville Memorial Park
- Greenmount War Memorial
- Gympie Memorial Park
- Gympie and Widgee War Memorial Gates
- Herberton War Memorial
- Howard War Memorial
- Ipswich Railway Workshops War Memorial
- Isis District War Memorial and Shire Council Chambers
- Ithaca War Memorial
- Koumala War Memorial
- Linville War Memorial
- Lt Thomas Armstrong Memorial
- Ma Ma Creek War Memorial
- Manly War Memorial
- Maroon War Memorial
- Mary Watson's Monument
- Miriam Vale War Memorial
- Mitchell War Memorial
- Montville Memorial Precinct
- Mowbray Park and East Brisbane War Memorial
- Our Lady of Victories Catholic Church
- Oxley War Memorial
- Paroo Shire Honour Board
- Pilot Officer Geoffrey Lloyd Wells Memorial Seat
- Pimpama & Ormeau War Memorial
- Pinkenba War Memorial
- Queens Gardens, Brisbane
- Queensland Korean War Memorial
- Rockhampton War Memorial
- Roma War Memorial and Heroes Avenue
- Sandgate War Memorial Park
- Sarina War Memorial
- Shrine of Remembrance, Brisbane
- Sir William Glasgow Memorial
- Soldiers Memorial Hall, Toowoomba
- South African War Memorial, Brisbane
- St Andrew's Presbyterian Memorial Church, Innisfail
- St Monica's War Memorial Cathedral
- Stanthorpe Soldiers Memorial
- Stanwell, Queensland
- Strathpine Honour Board
- Temple of Peace (Toowong Cemetery)
- Tieri War Memorial
- Tobruk Memorial Baths
- Toogoolawah War Memorial
- Toowong Memorial Park
- Townsville West State School
- Traveston Powder Magazine
- Trooper Cobb's Grave
- Victor Denton War Memorial
- War Memorial Bridge, Brooweena
- Warwick War Memorial
- Weeping Mother Memorial
- Westbrook War Memorial
- Windsor War Memorial Park
- Woody Point Memorial Hall
- World War I Cenotaph, Mackay
- World War I memorials in Queensland
- Yeppoon War Memorial
- Yeronga Memorial Park

=== Brisbane ===
==== Anzac Square ====
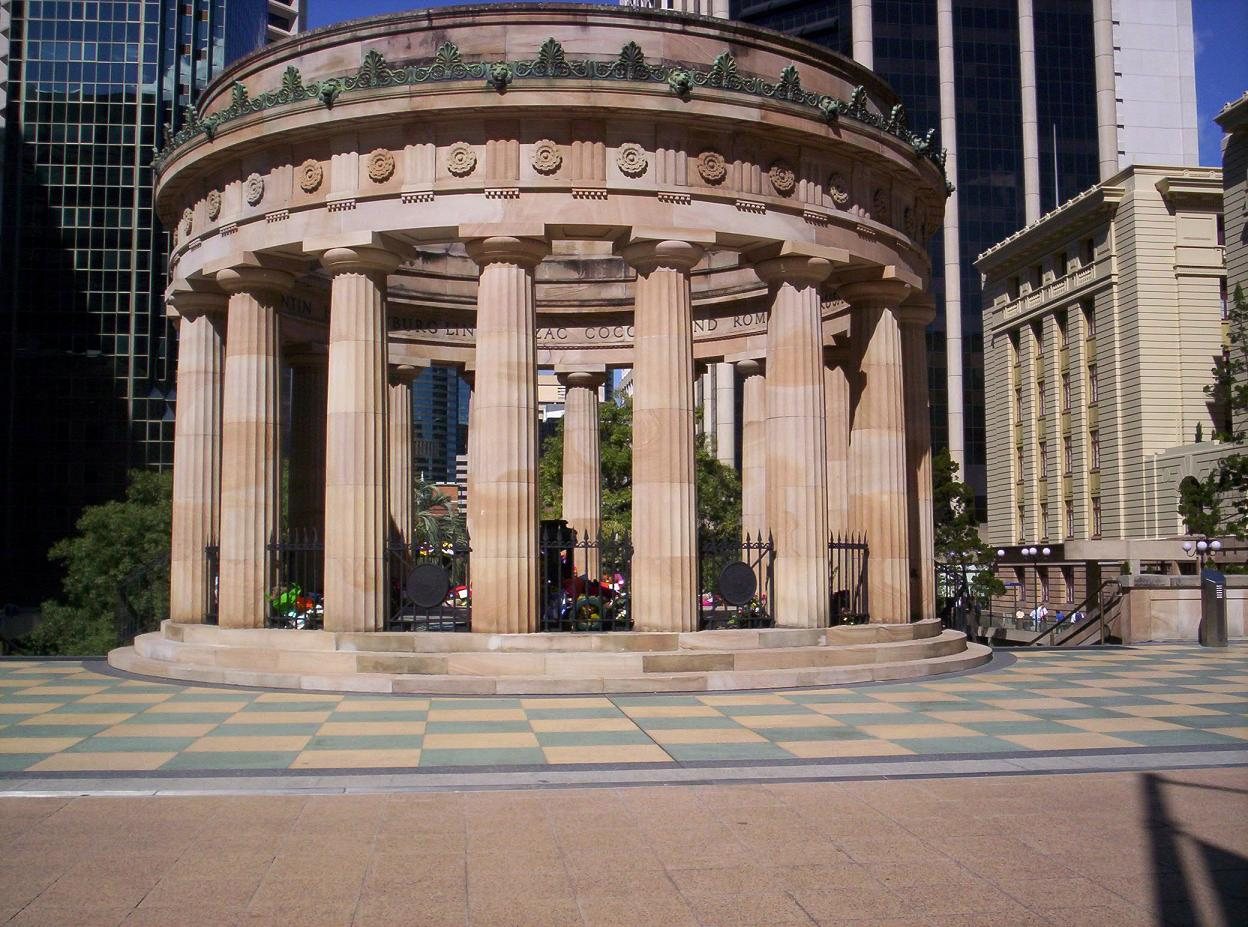
Shrine of Remembrance, Anzac Square

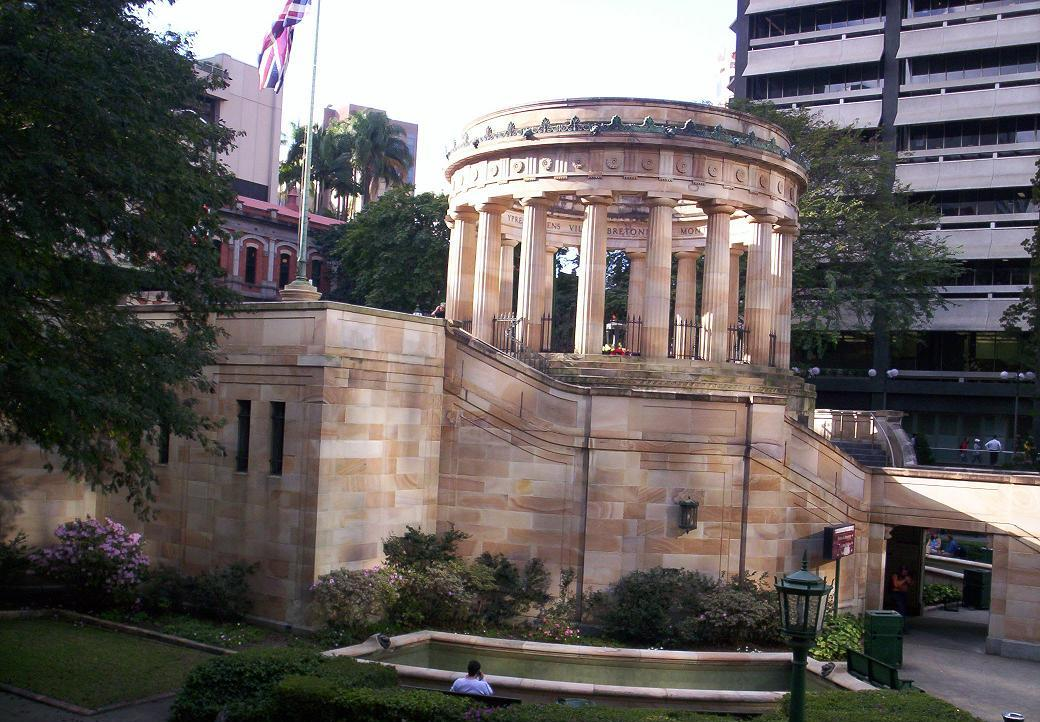
Shrine of Remembrance Anzac Square façade, showing the lower section which contains the crypt with the World War II Shrine of Memories

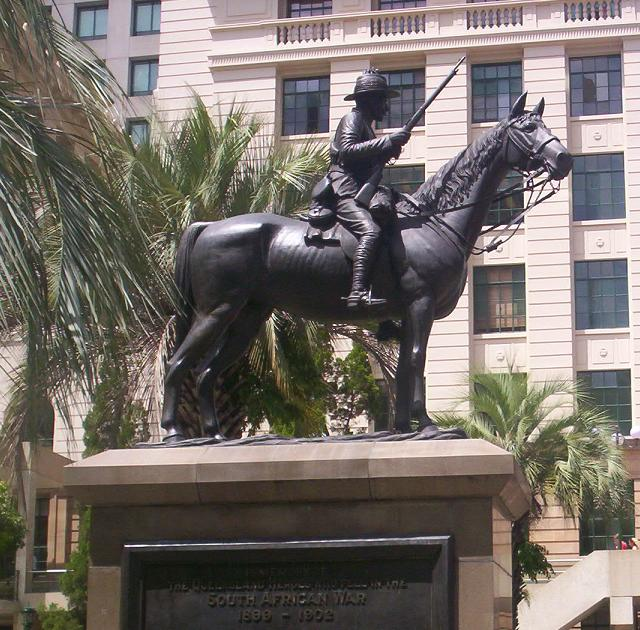
Second Boer War Memorial

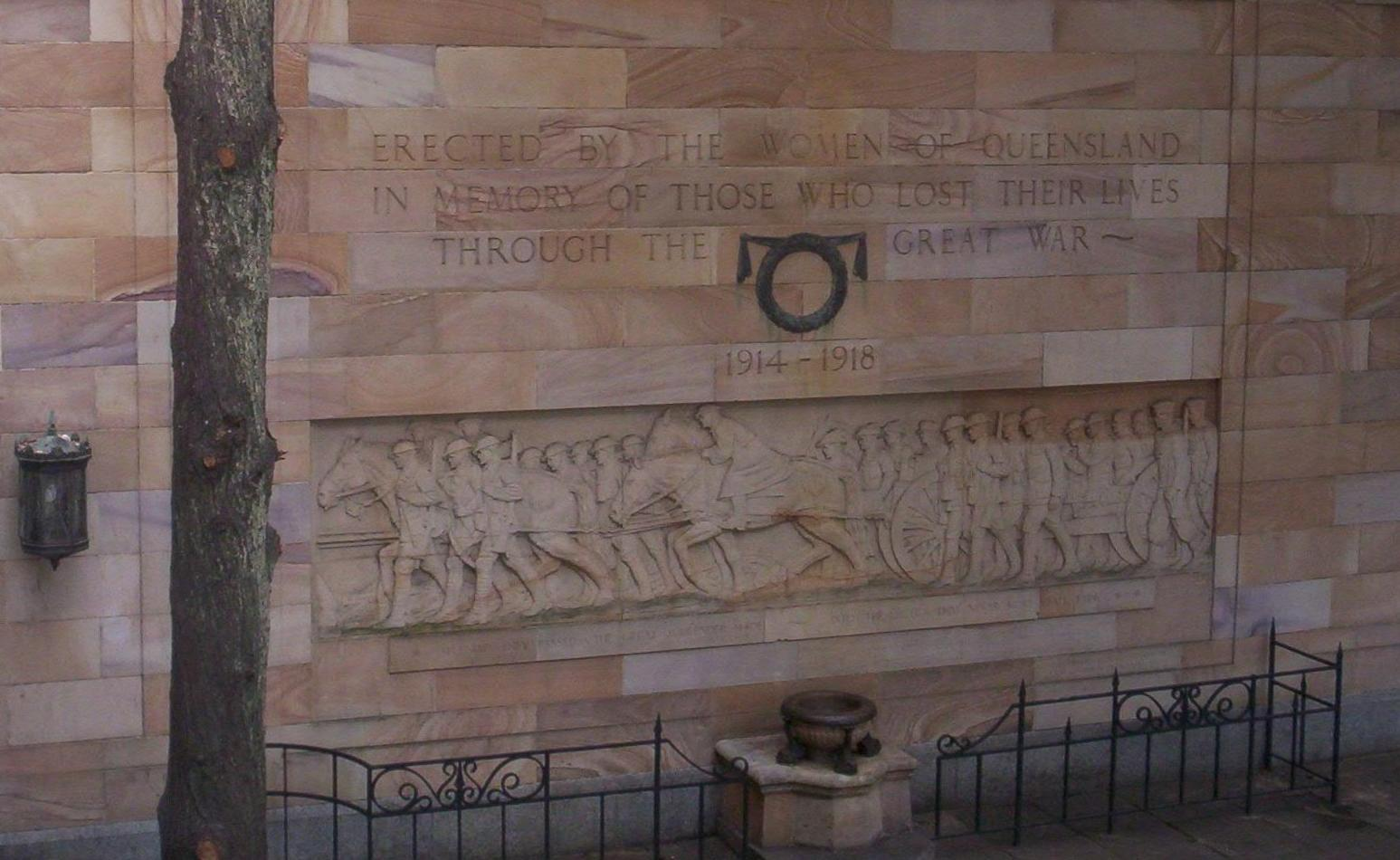
World War I Memorial Sculpture on the external wall of the Shrine of Memories section of the Shrine of Remembrance

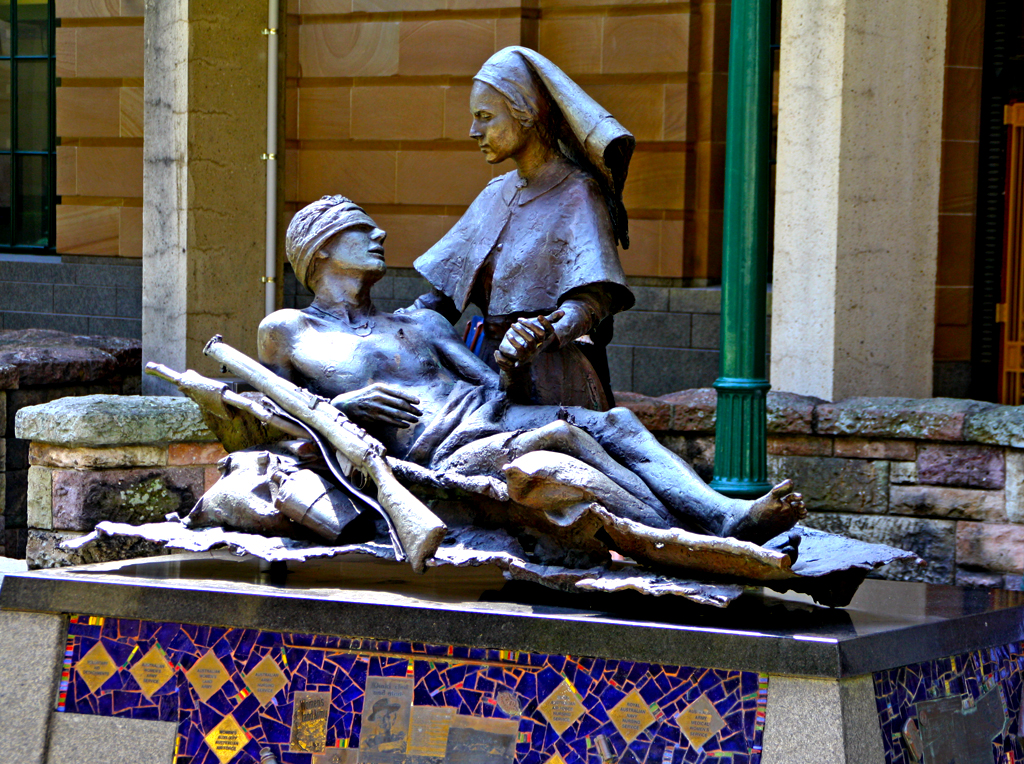
World War II Memorial

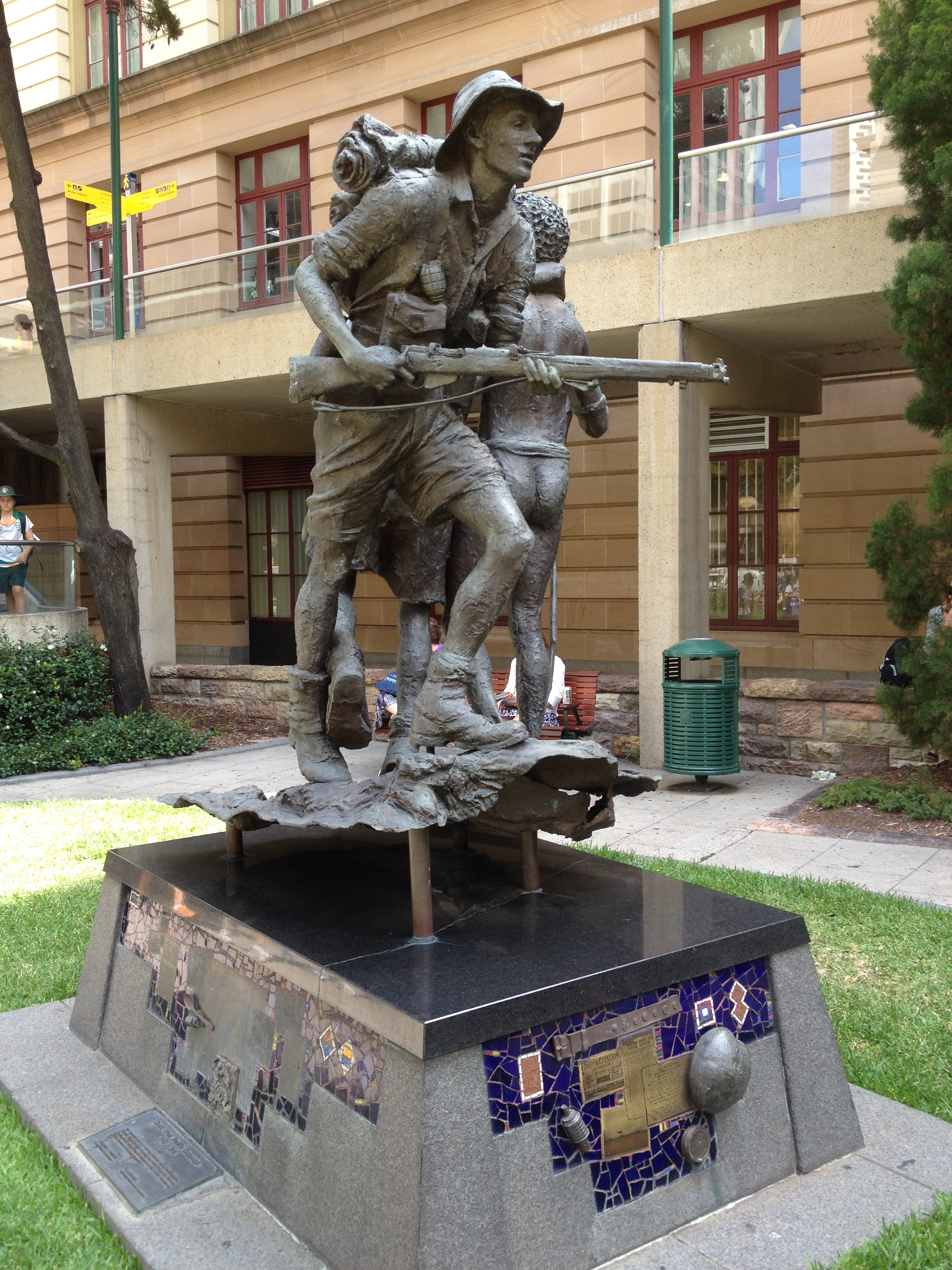
South West Pacific Campaign Memorial

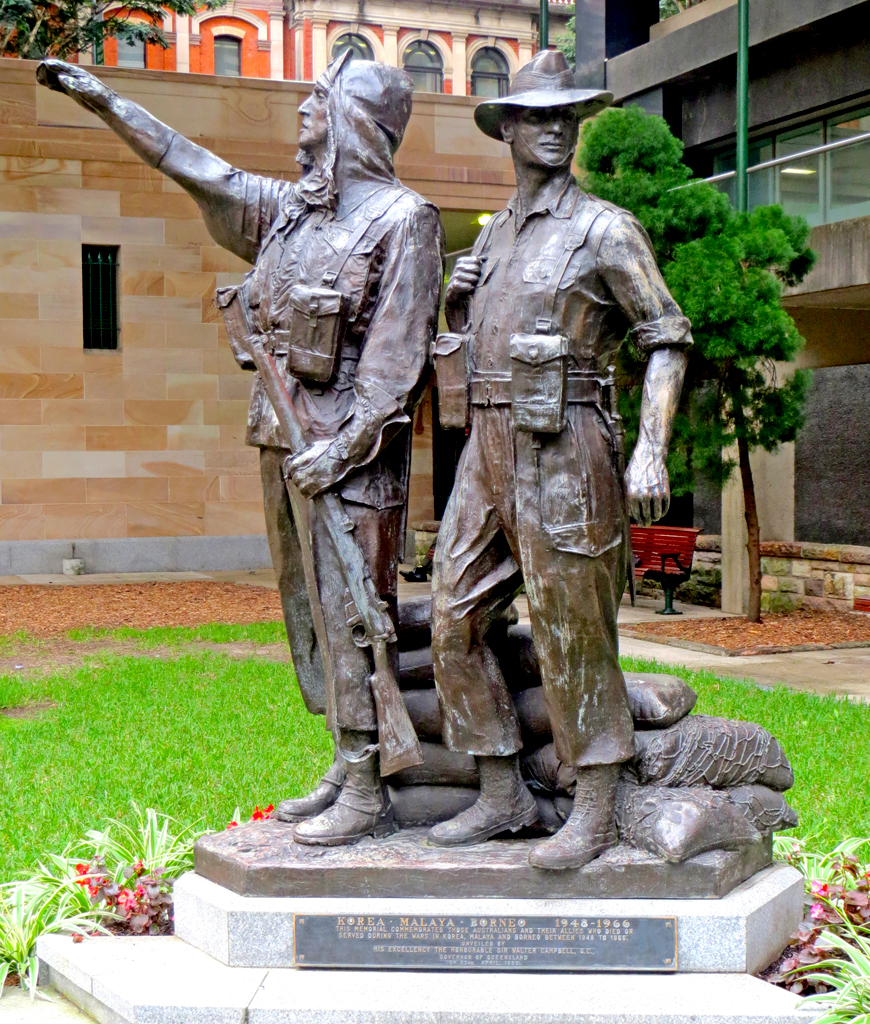
Korea Malaya Borneo 1948-1966 Memorial

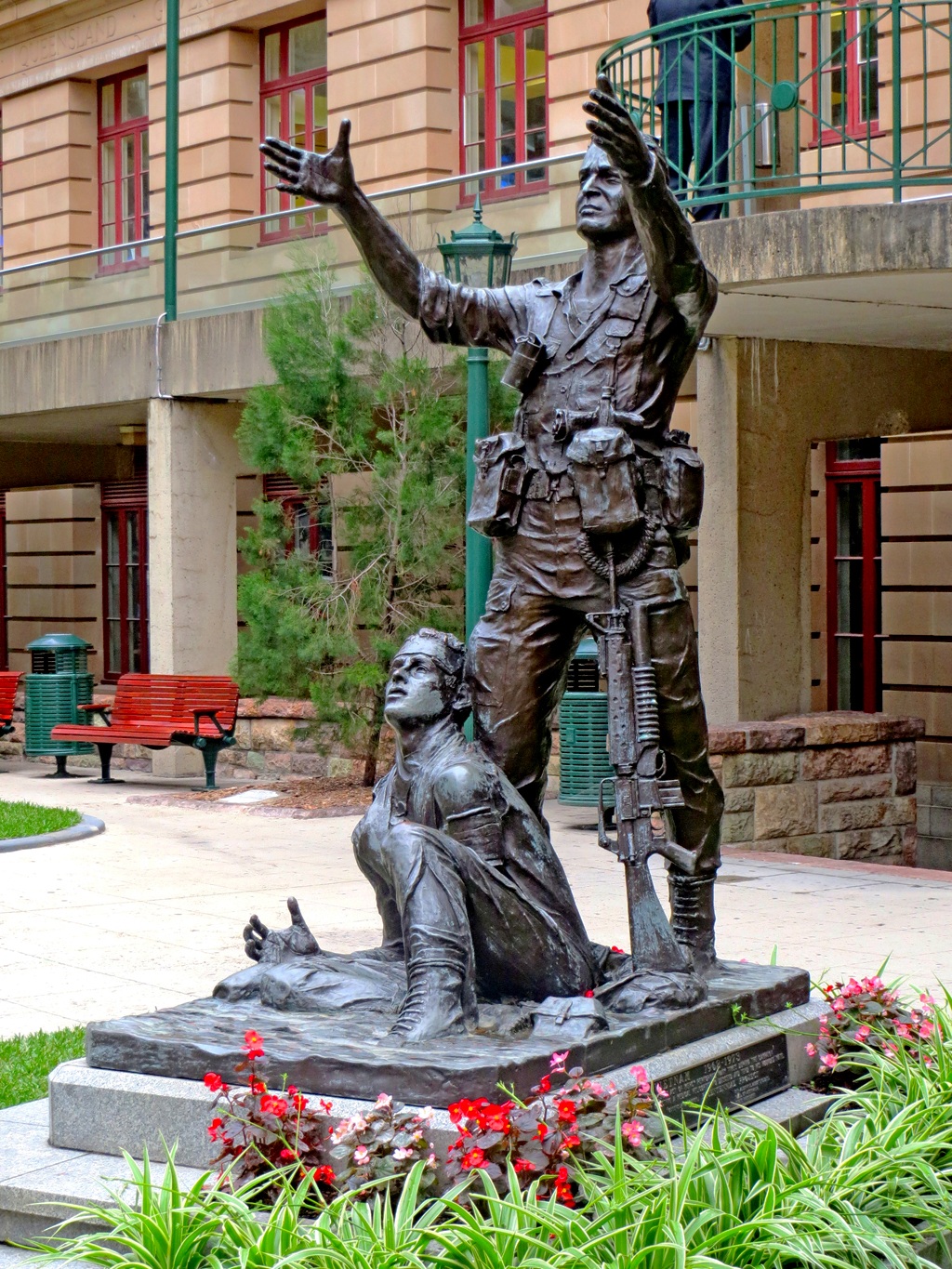
Vietnam War Memorial

==== Brisbane CBD ====
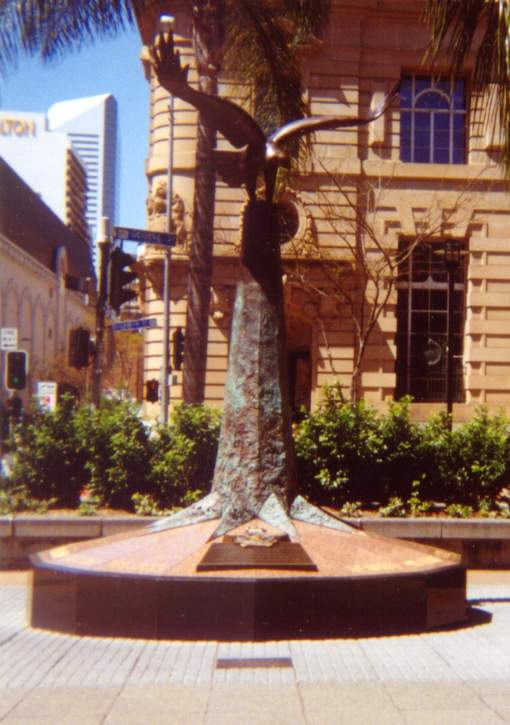
RAAF Memorial
at Queens Gardens

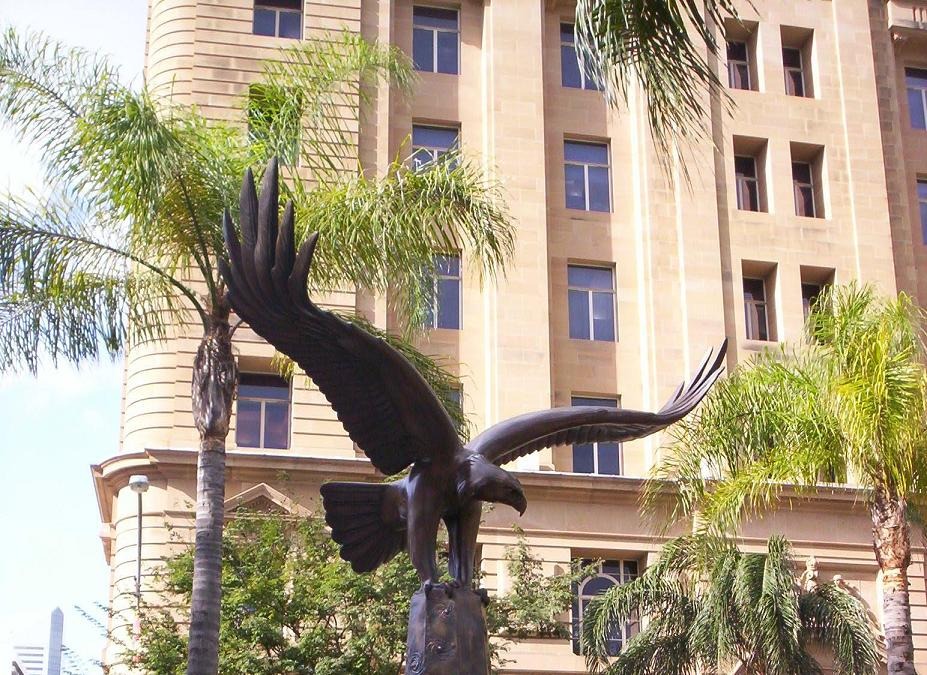
The Eagle on top of
the RAAF Memorial
at Queens Gardens

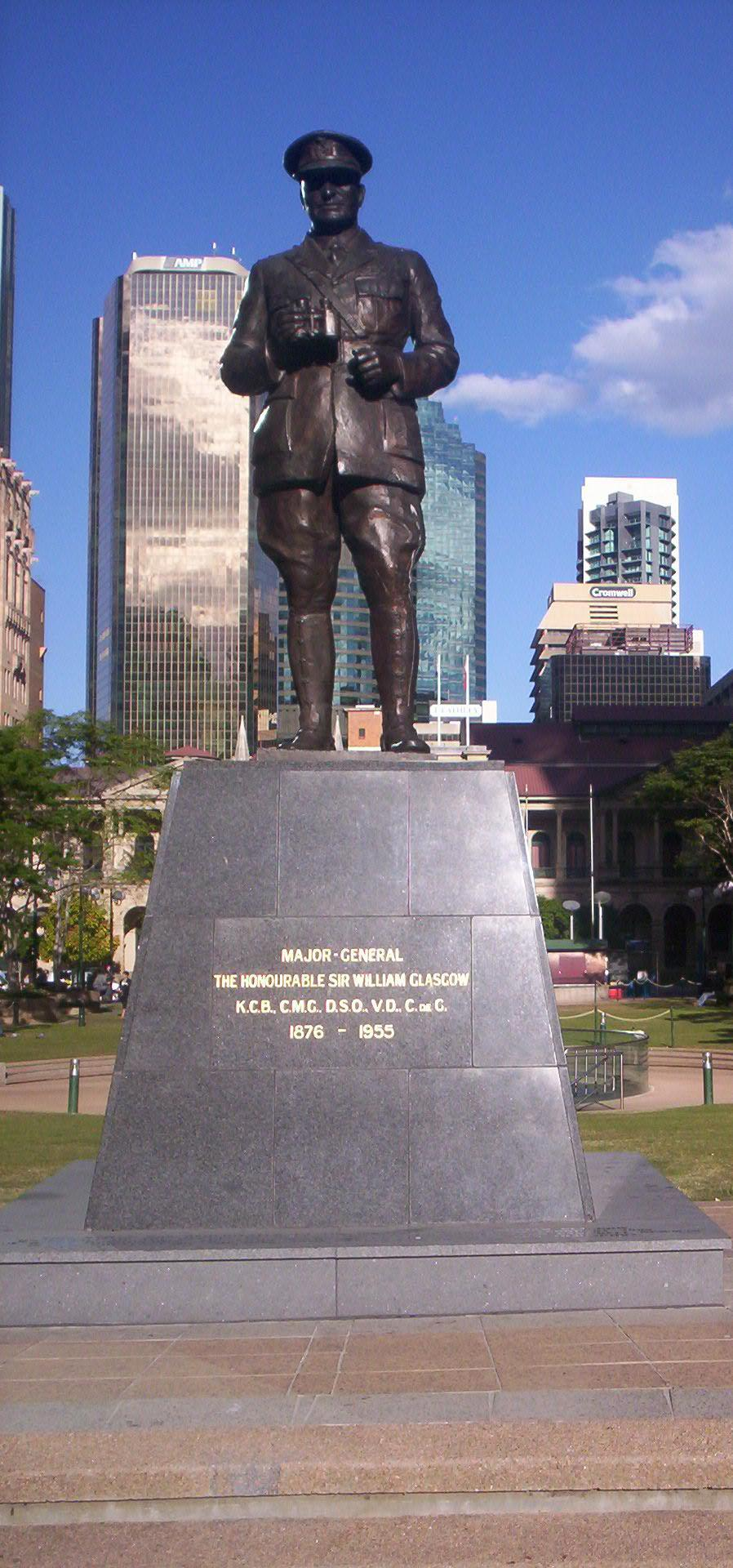
Statue of Major-General
Sir William Glasgow
at Post Office Square

==== Brisbane suburbs ====
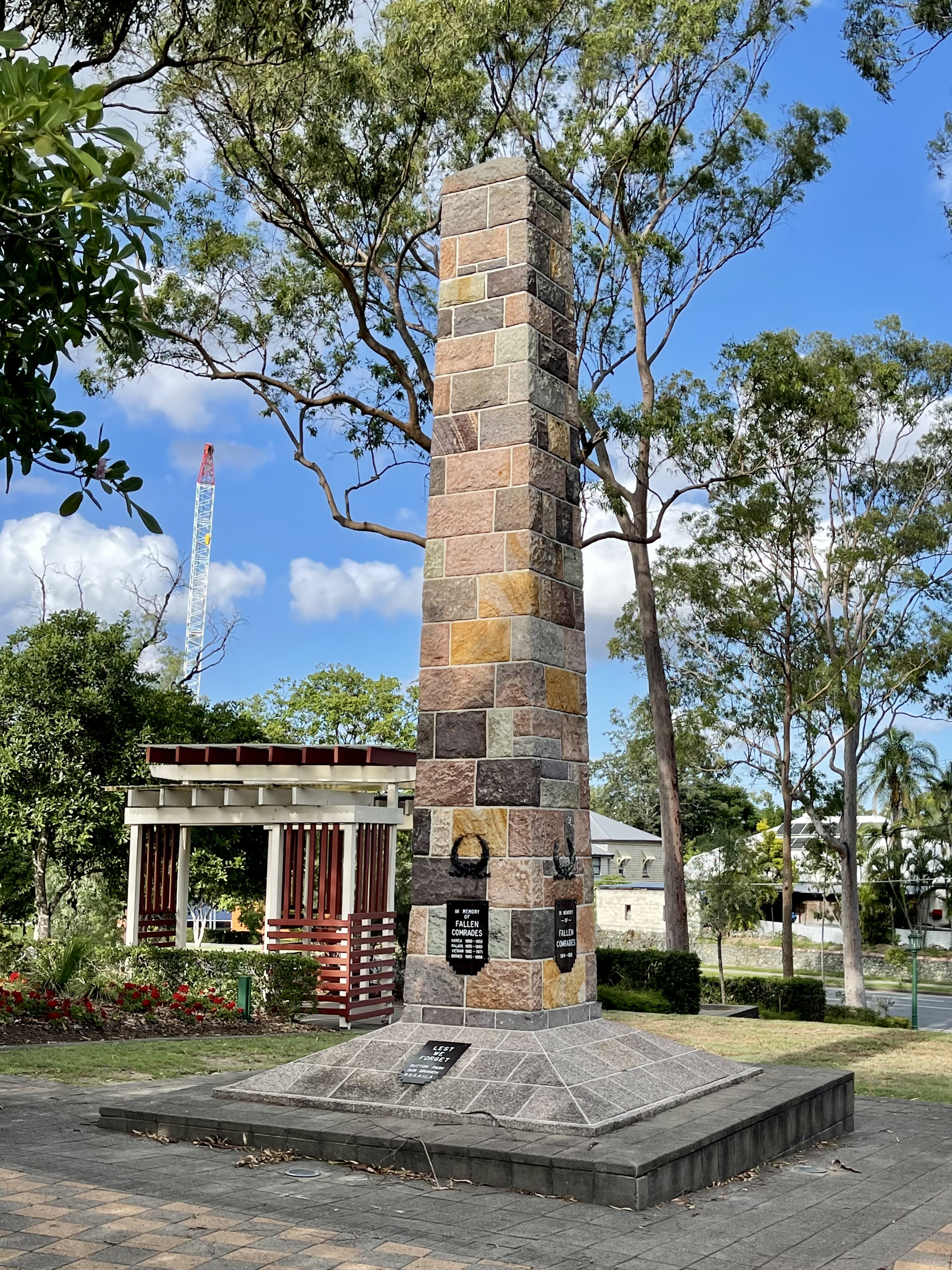
Dutton Park War Memorial, Dutton Park

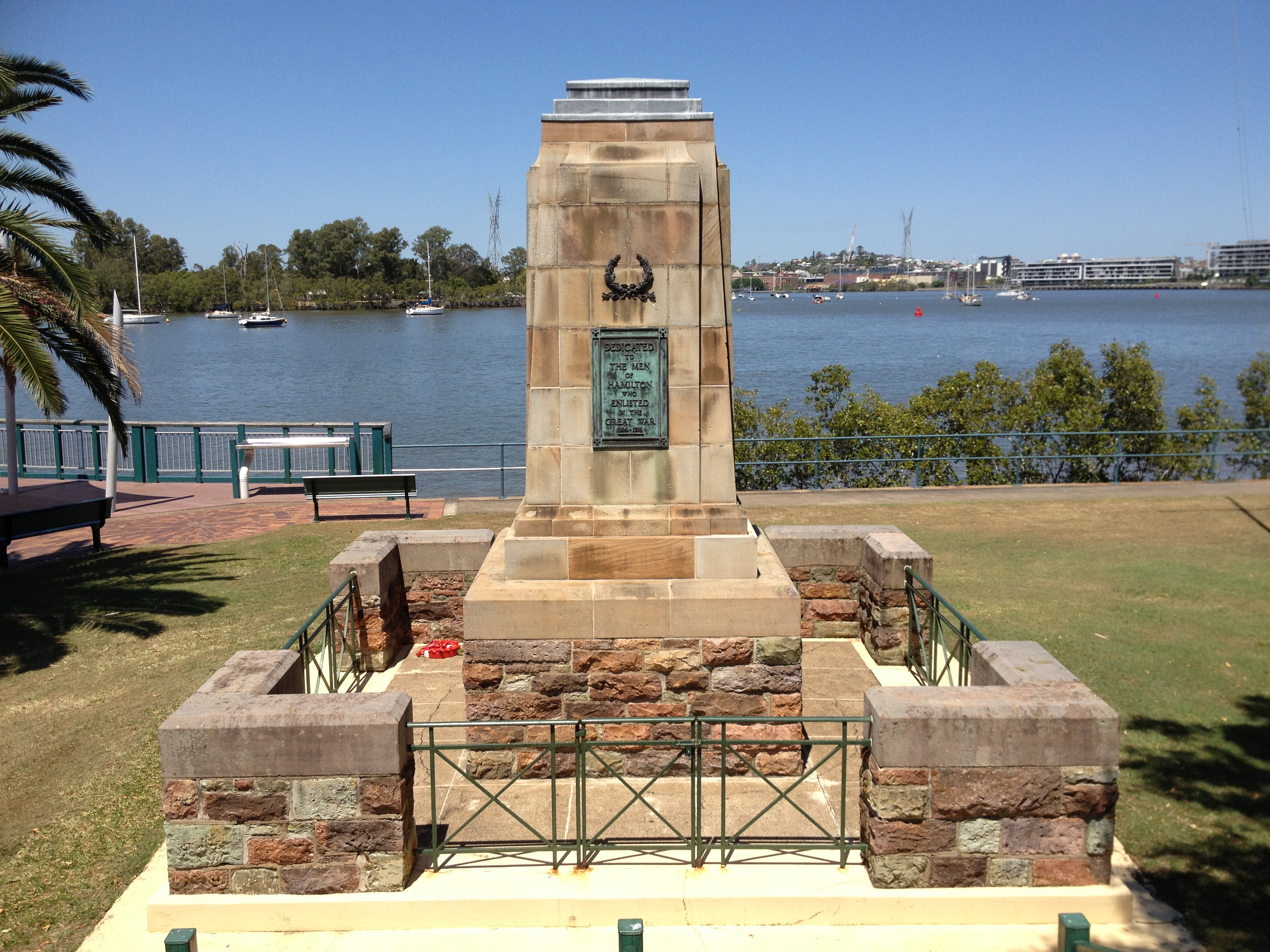
Cameron Rocks War Memorial, Hamilton

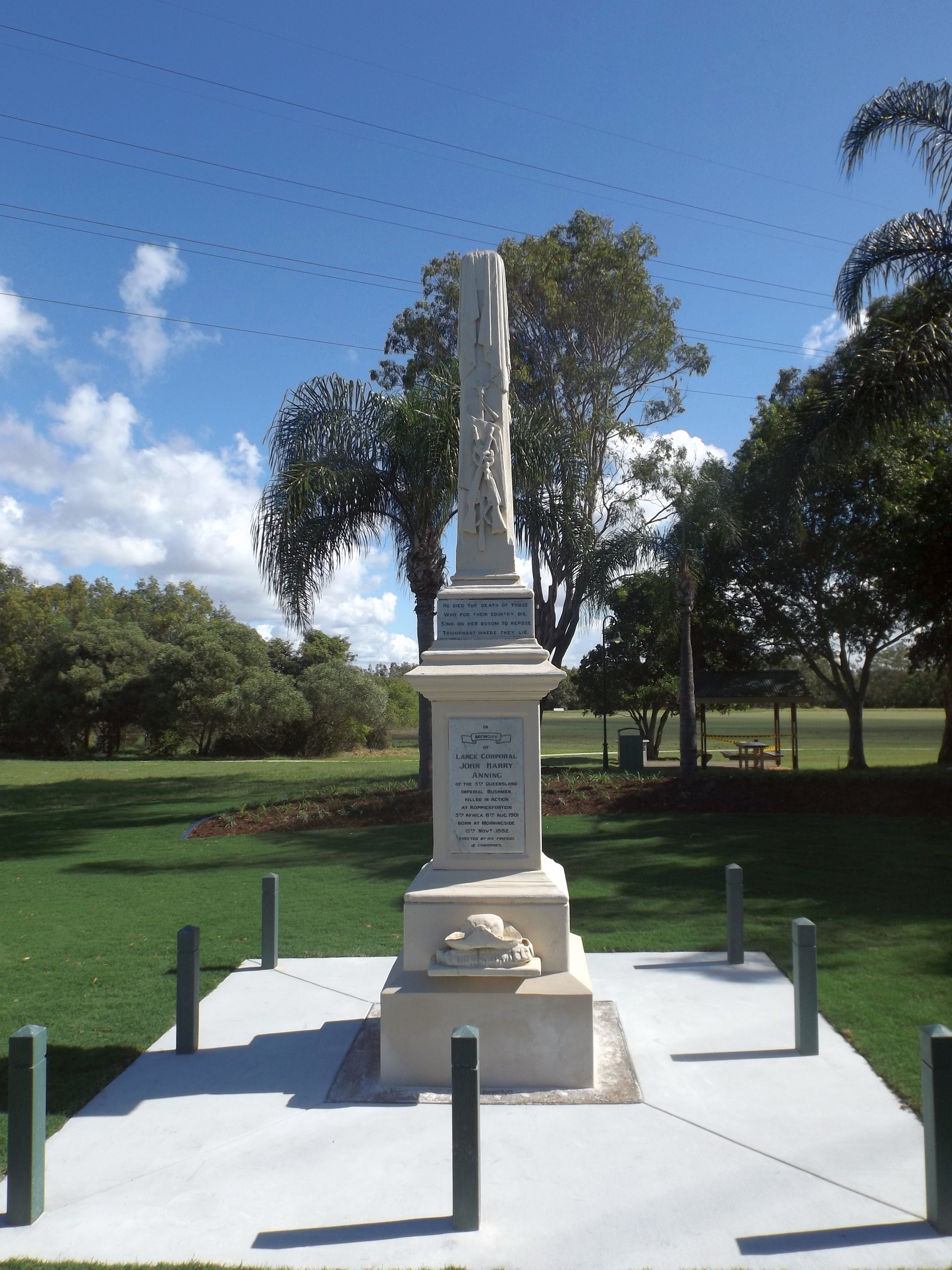
Anning Monument, Hemmant

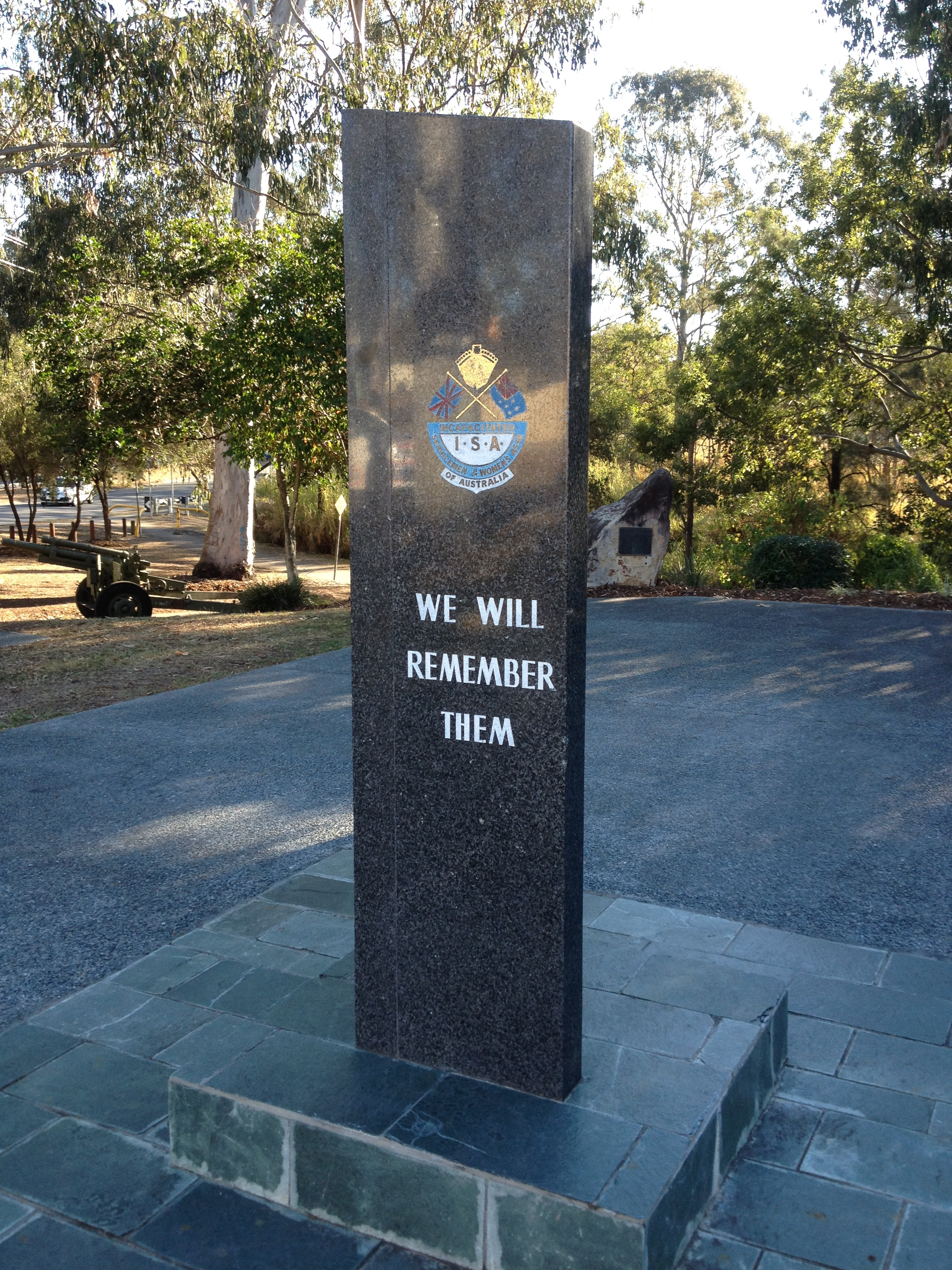
ISA War Memorial, Inala

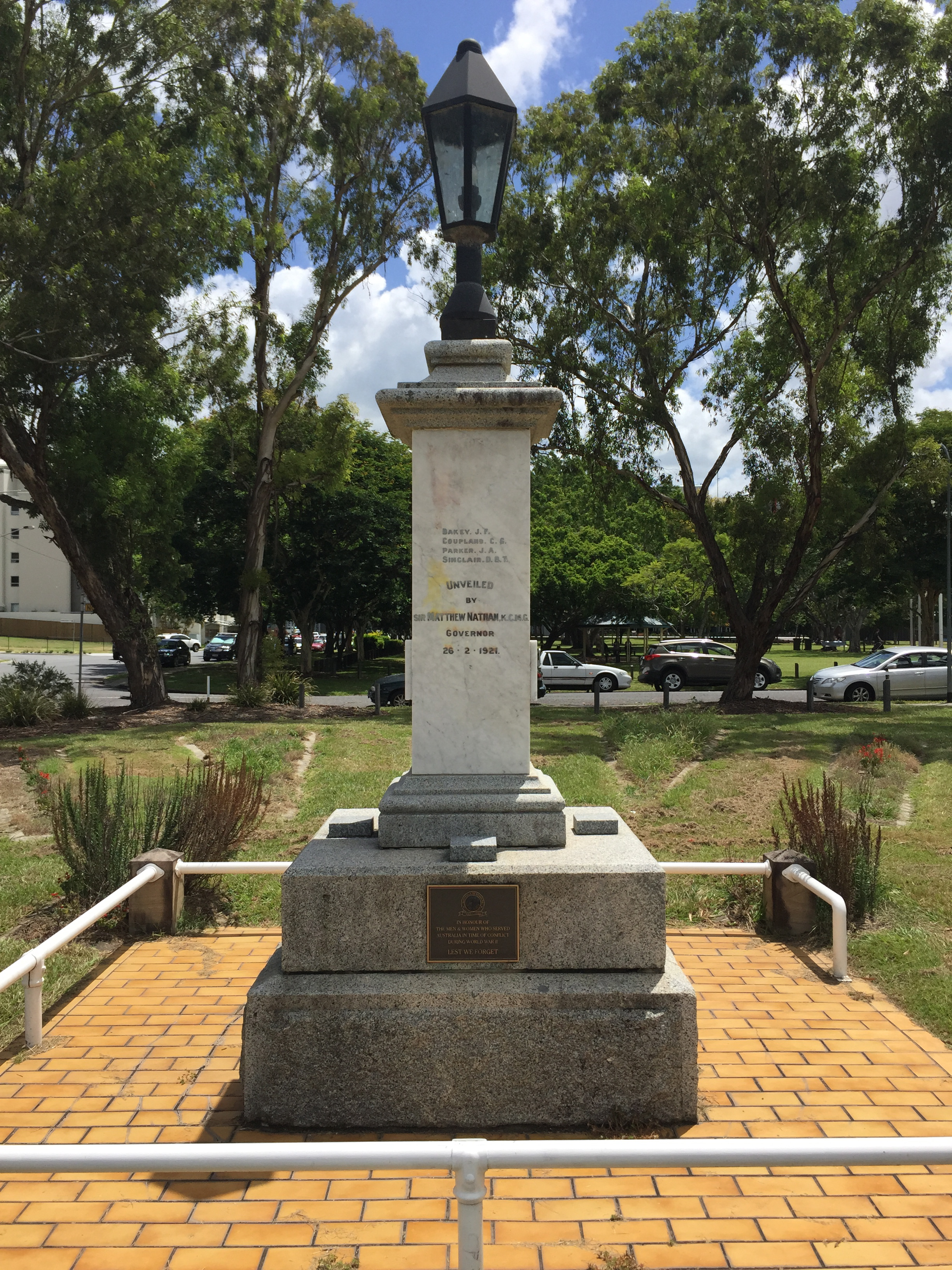
Indooroopilly Fallen Sailors and Soldiers Monument, Indooroopilly

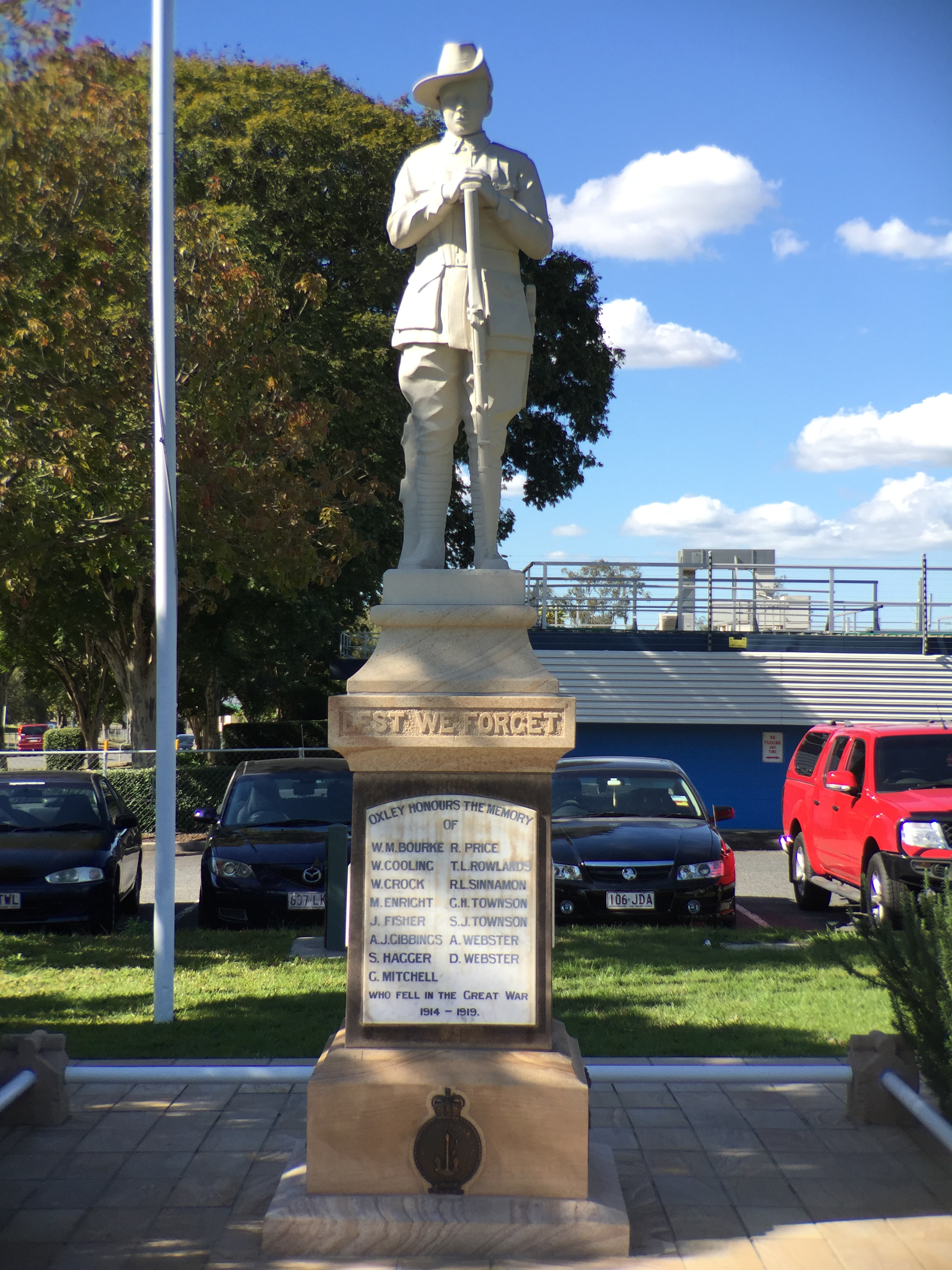
Oxley War Memorial

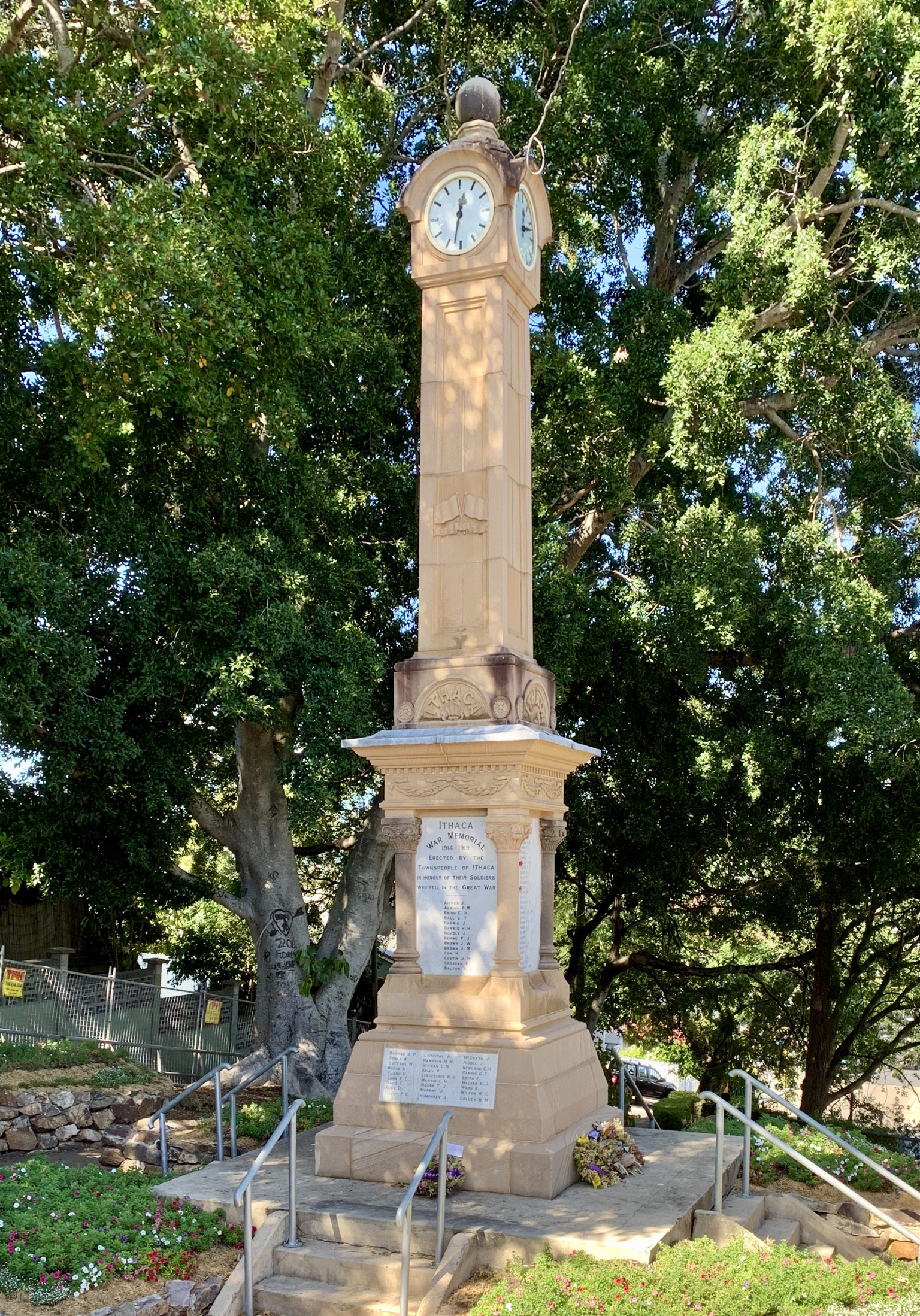
Ithaca War Memorial, Paddington

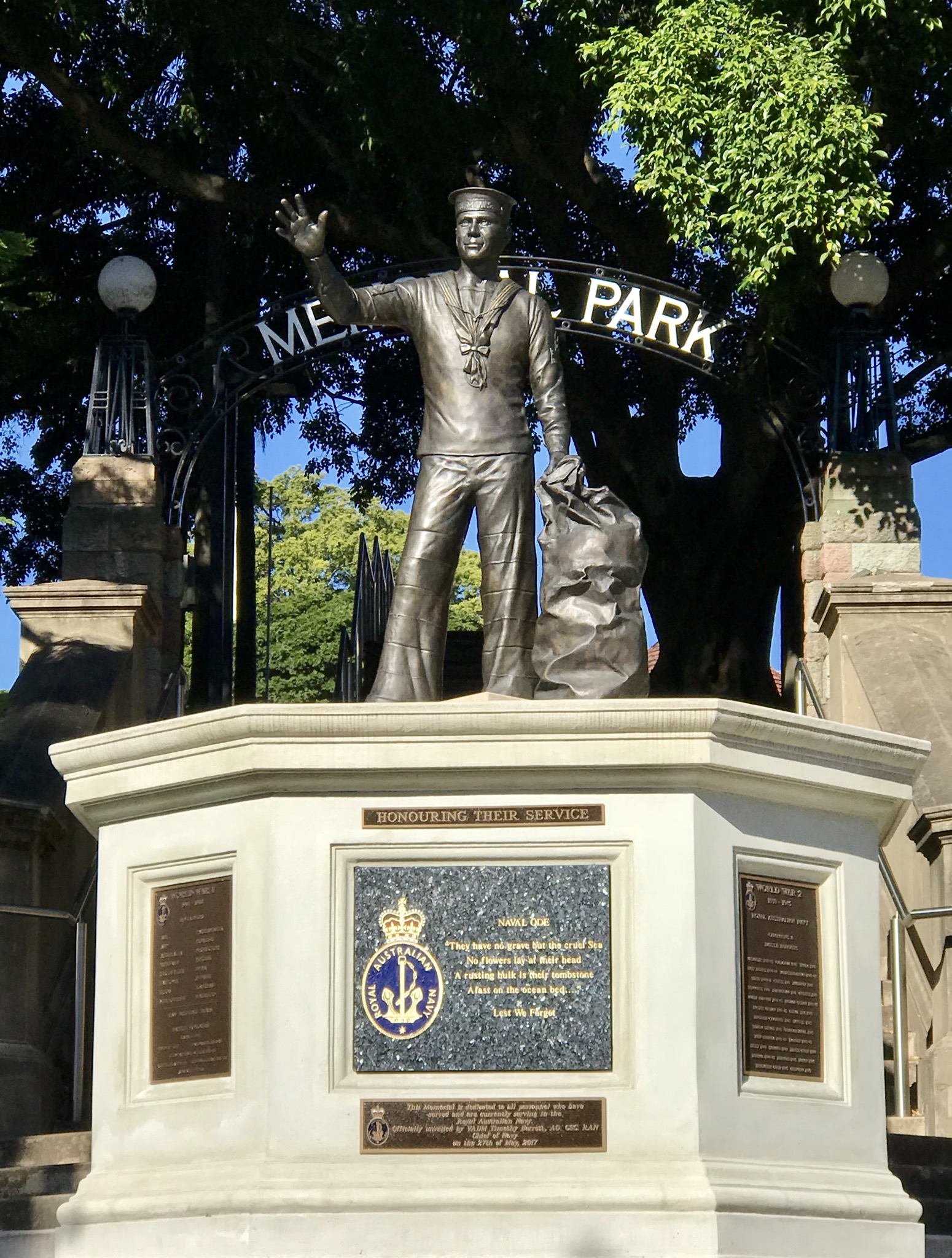
War Memorial,
South Brisbane

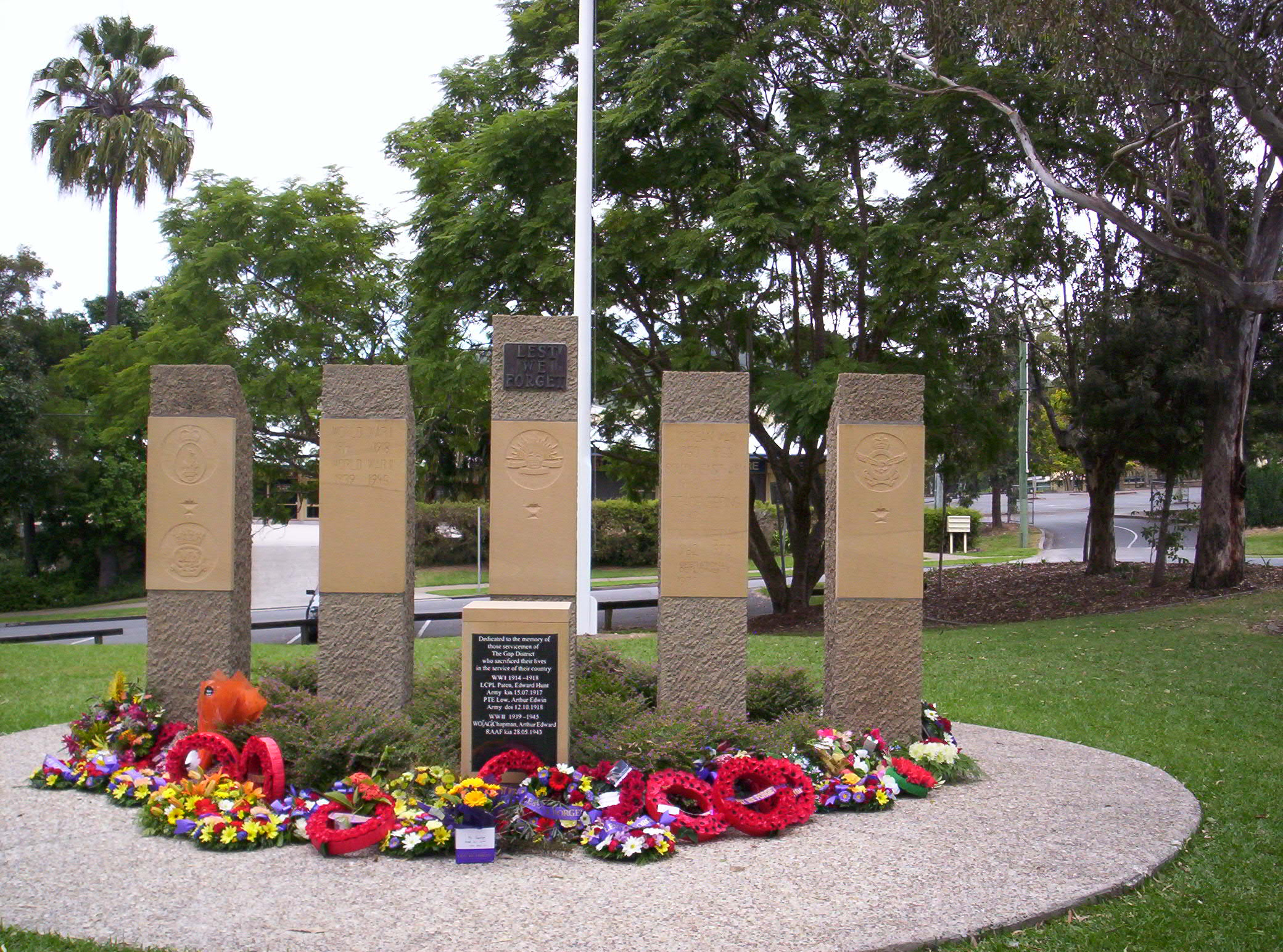
War Memorial, The Gap

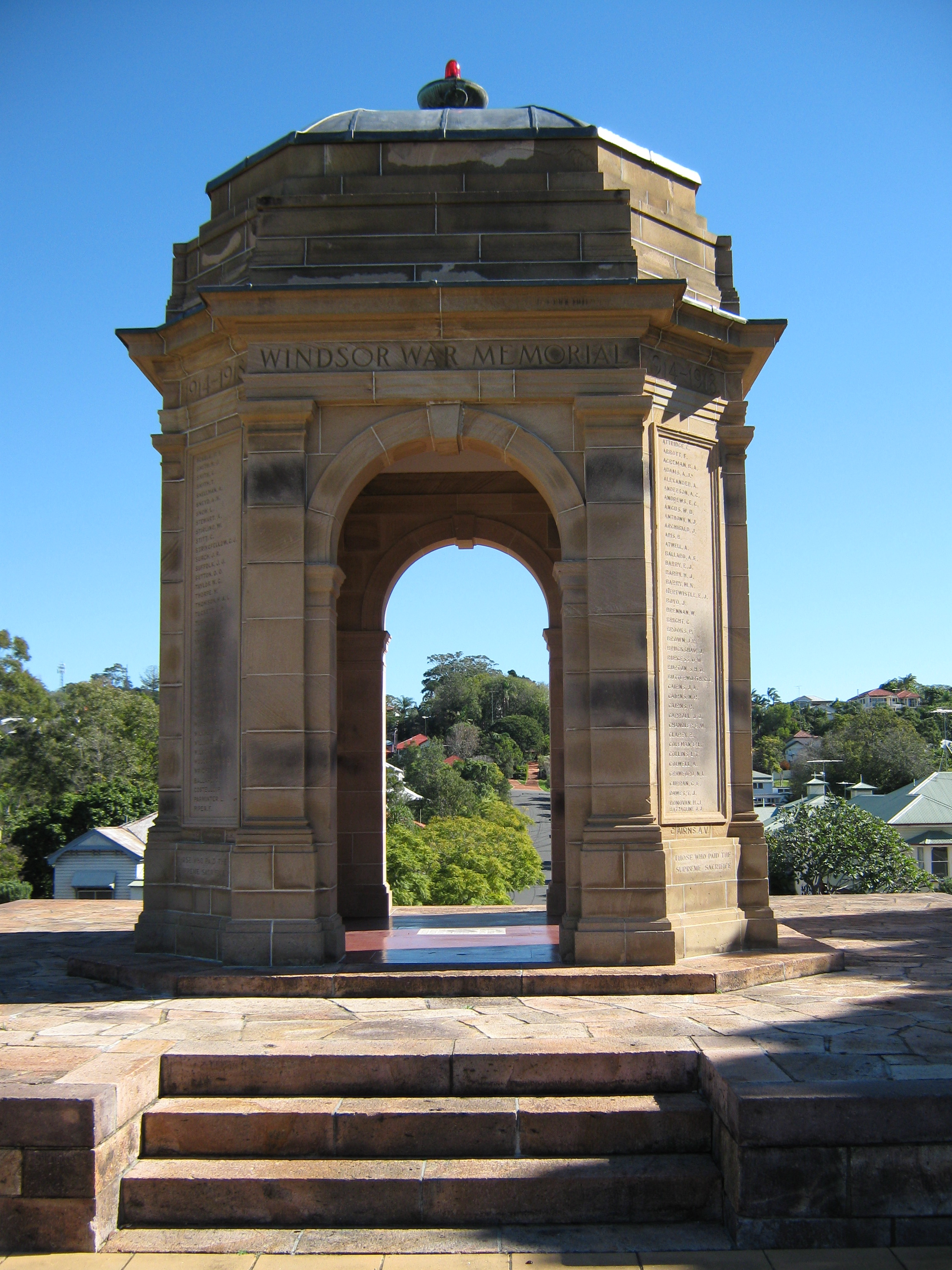
War Memorial, Windsor

===== Monument to non-Australian forces =====
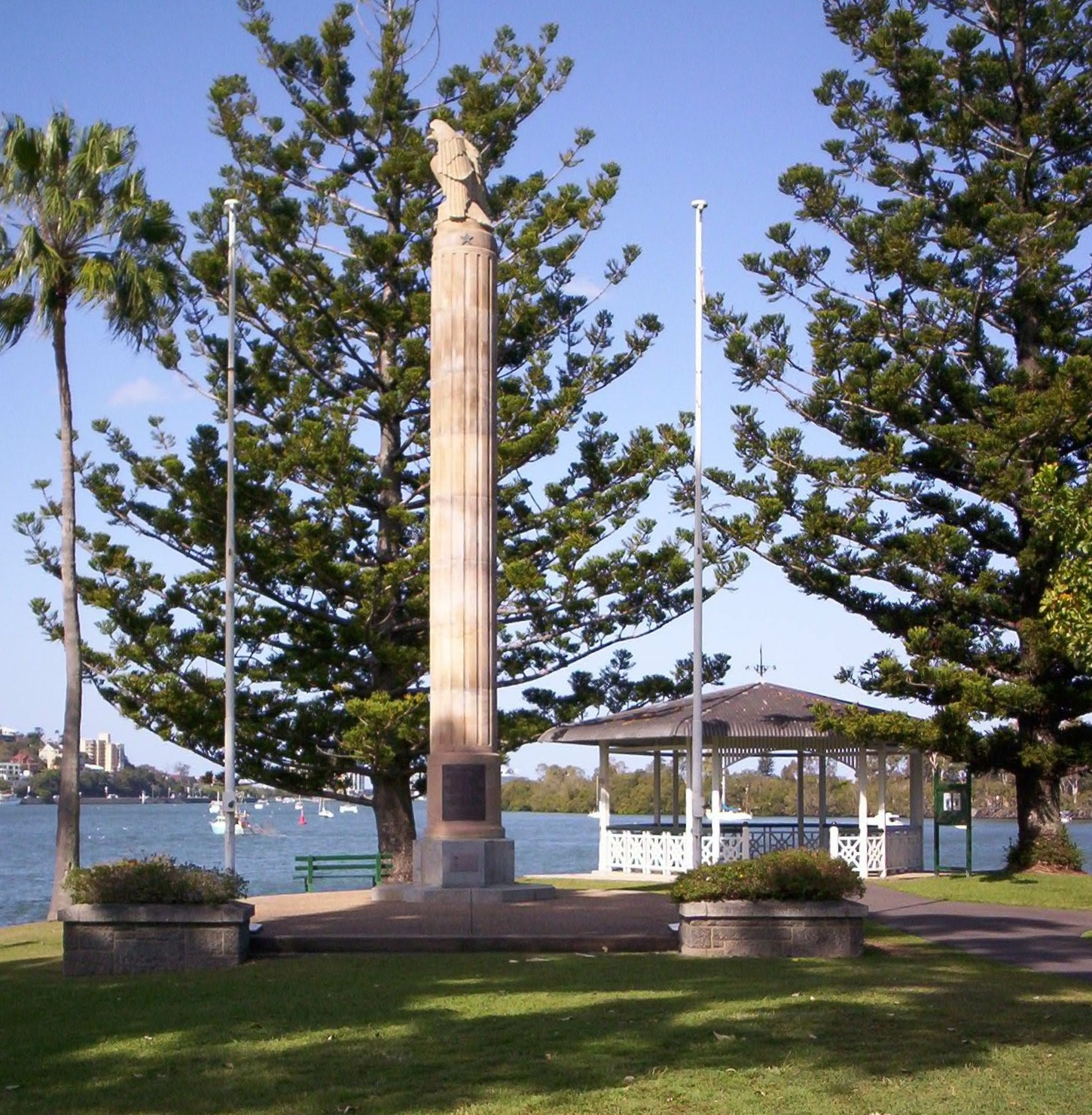
Monument to the United States forces for their help in World War II. The monument is in the grounds of Newstead House, Newstead

=== Regional Queensland ===
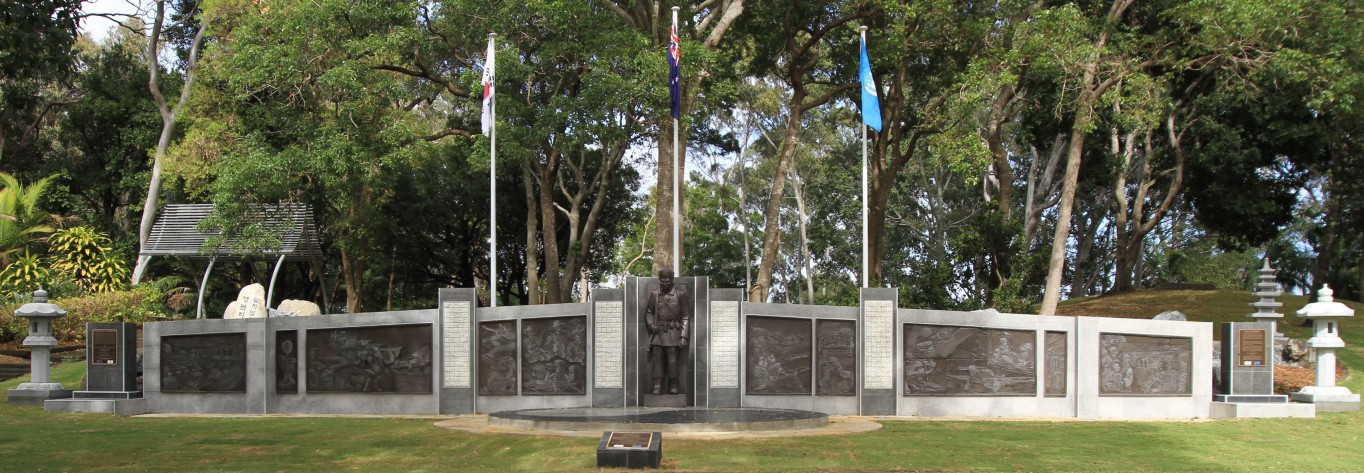
Queensland Korean War Memorial, Gold Coast Highway, Cascade Gardens, Broadbeach

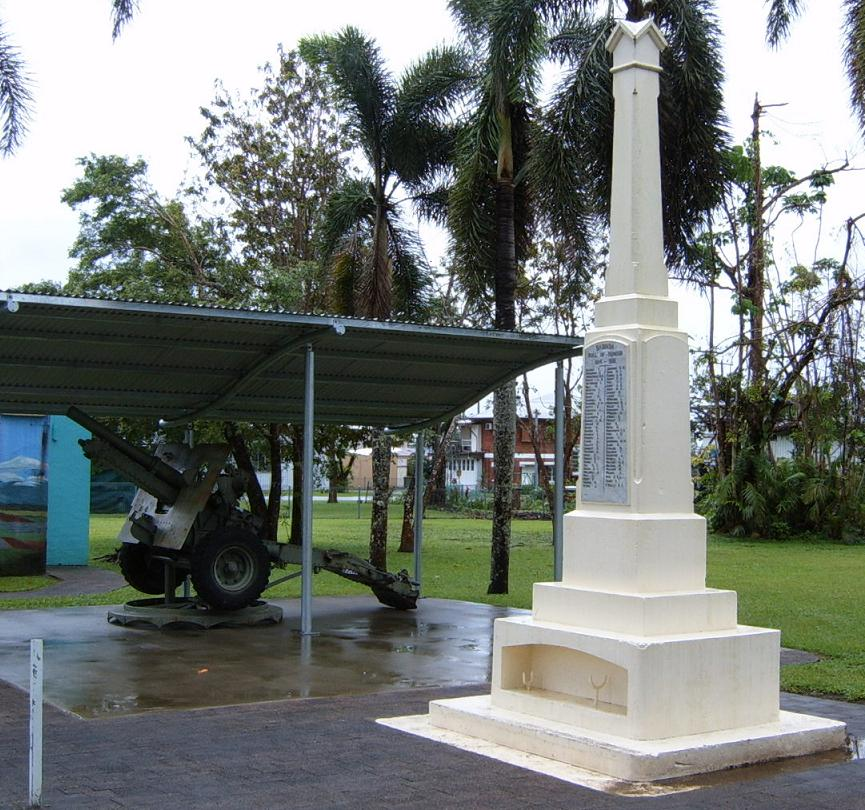
Babinda

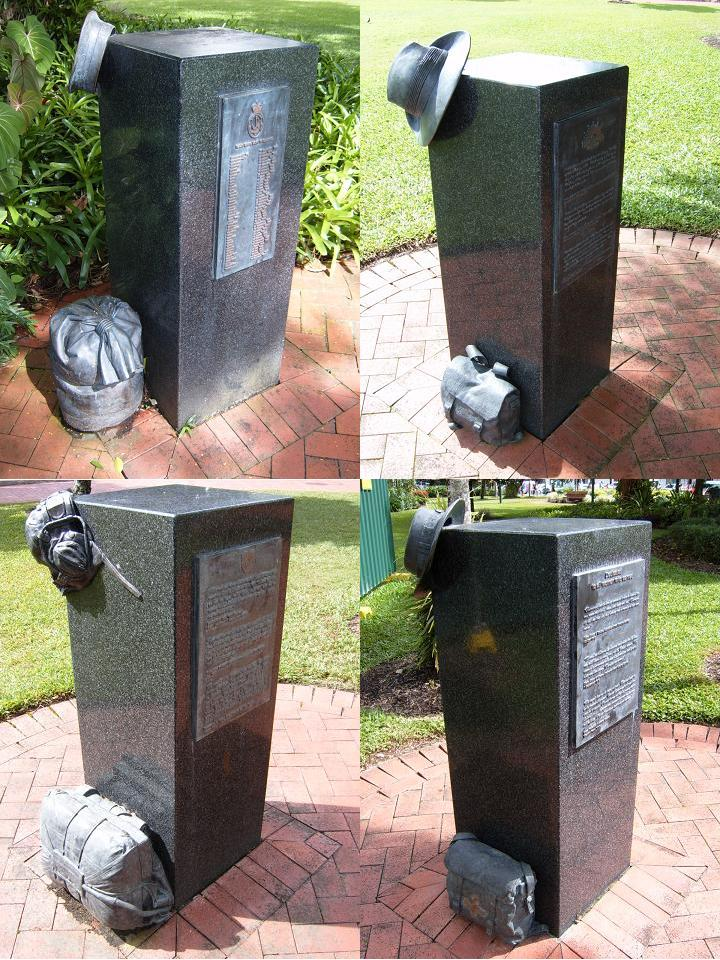
Cairns

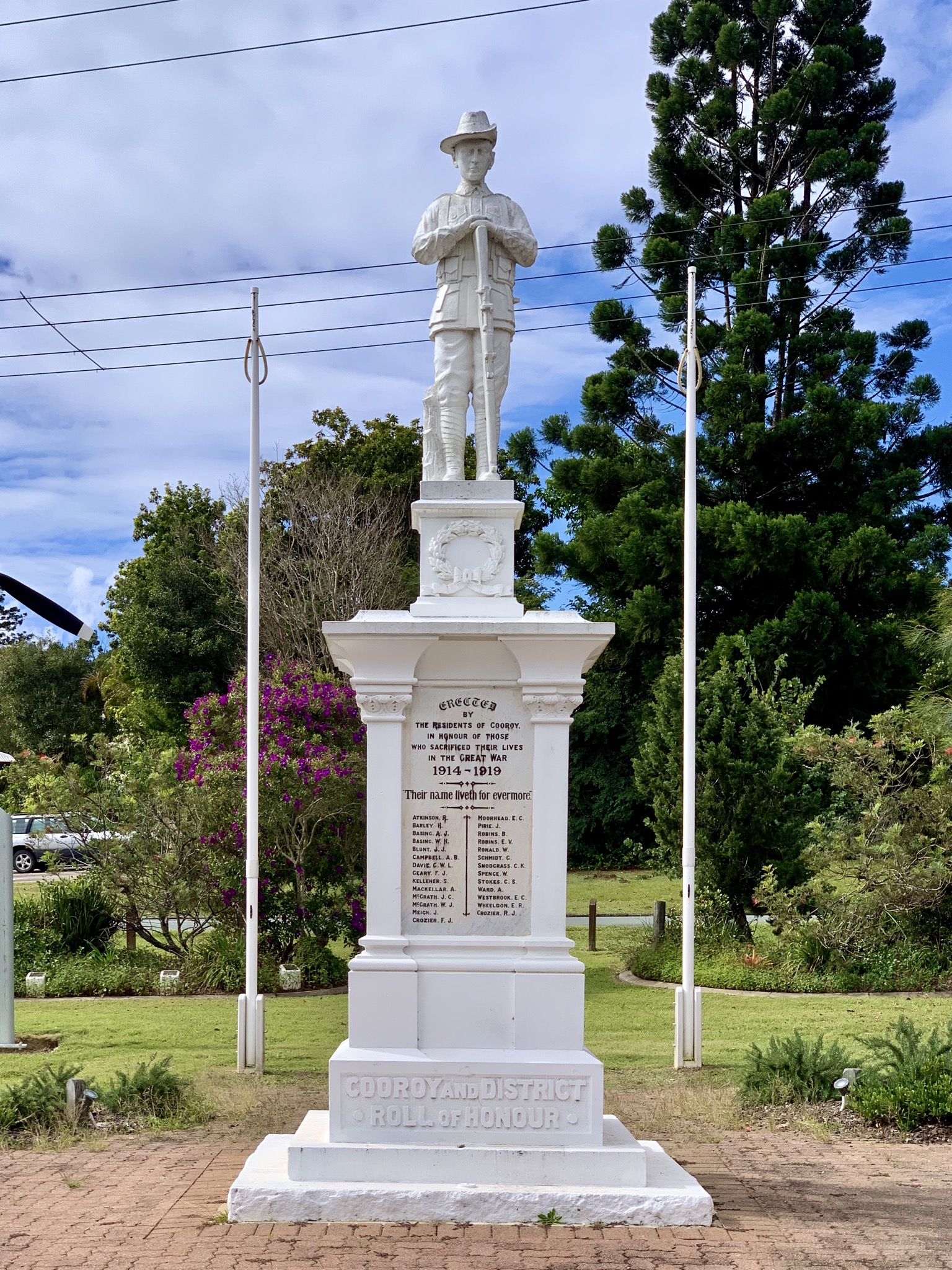
Cooroy

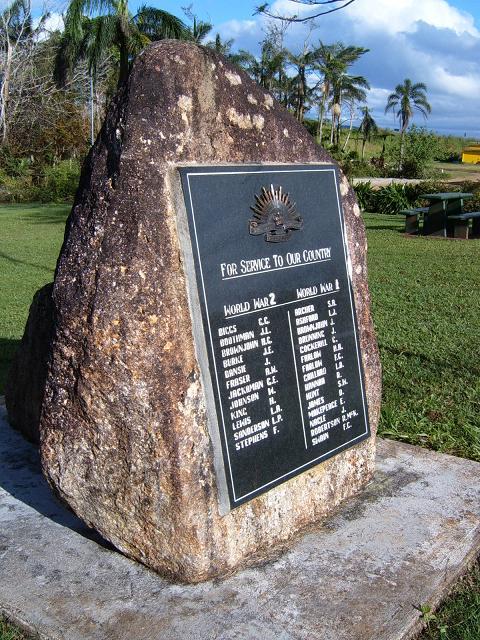
Eacham

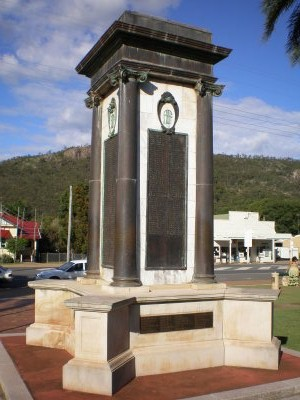
Esk

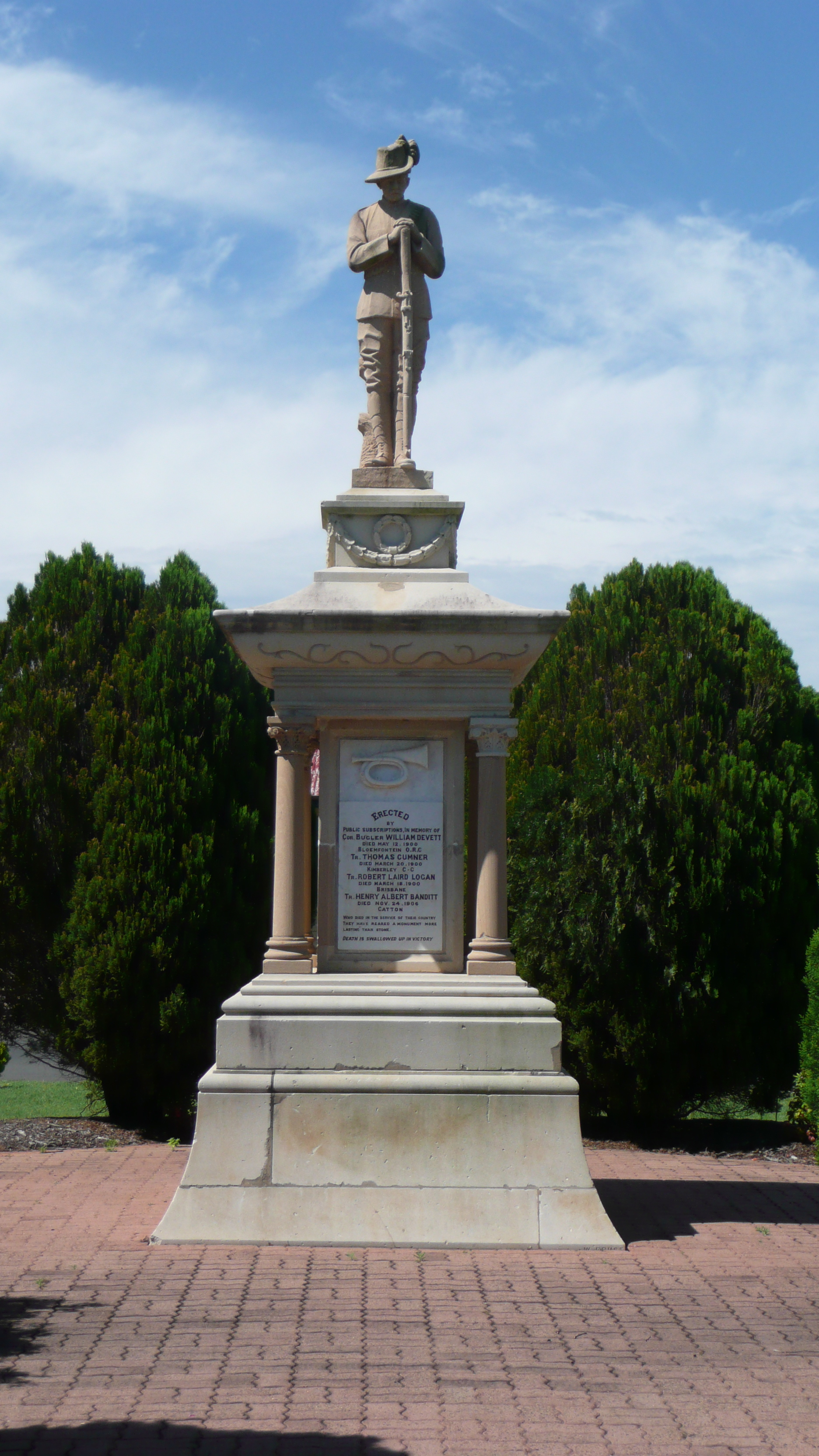
Boer War Memorial, Gatton

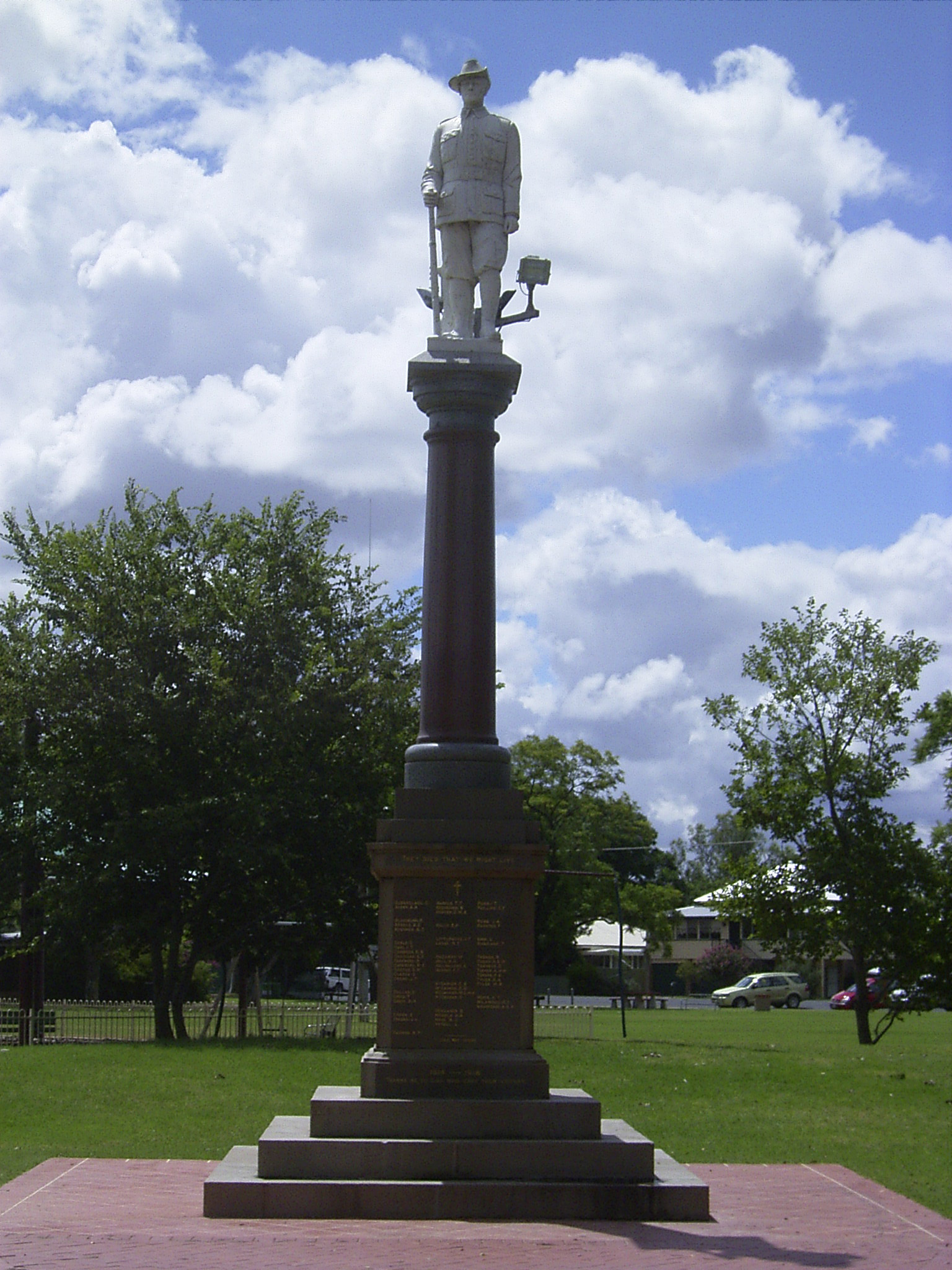
Goondiwindi

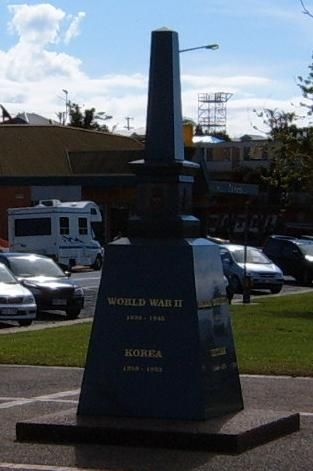
Innisfail

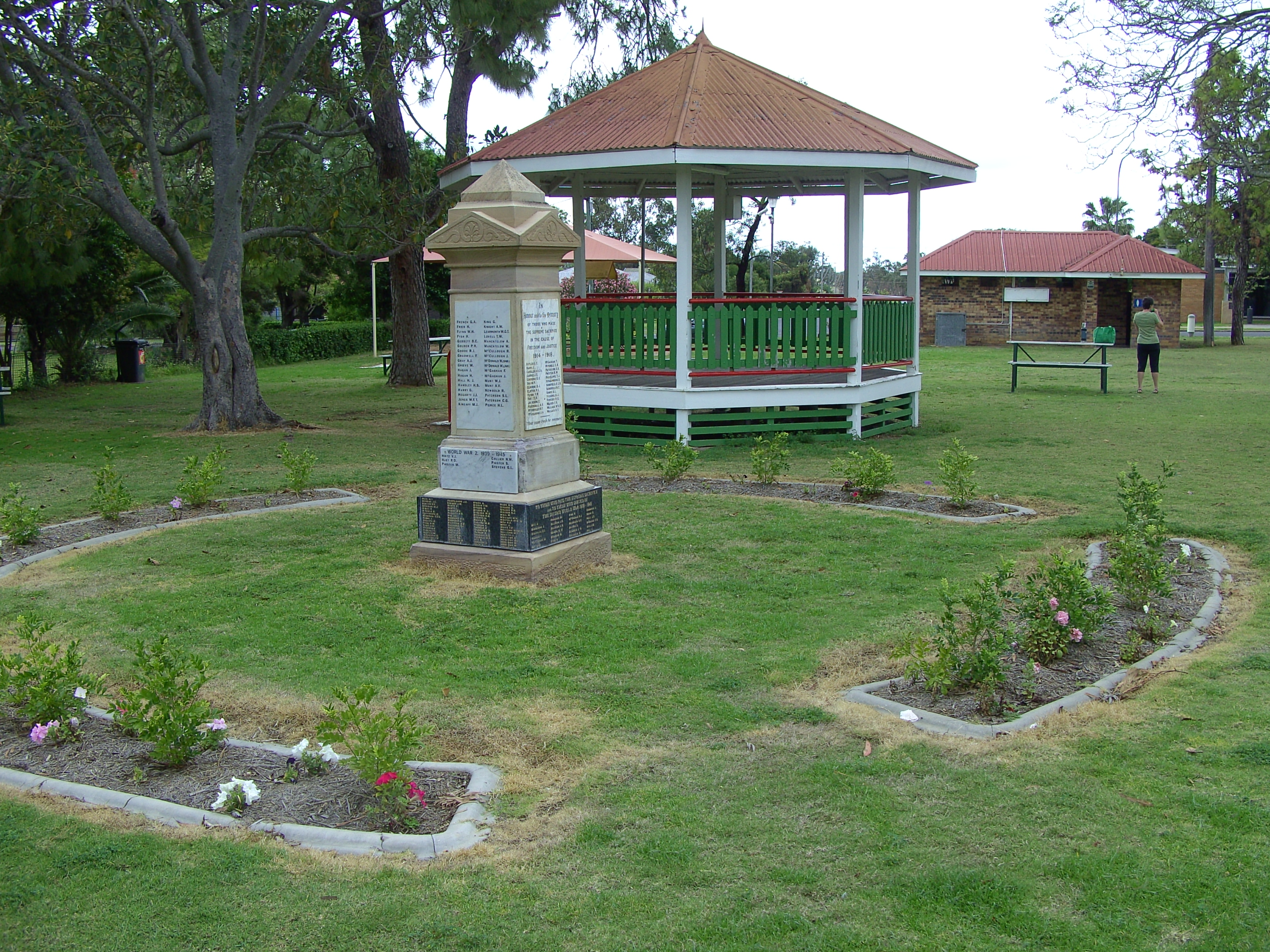
Millmerran

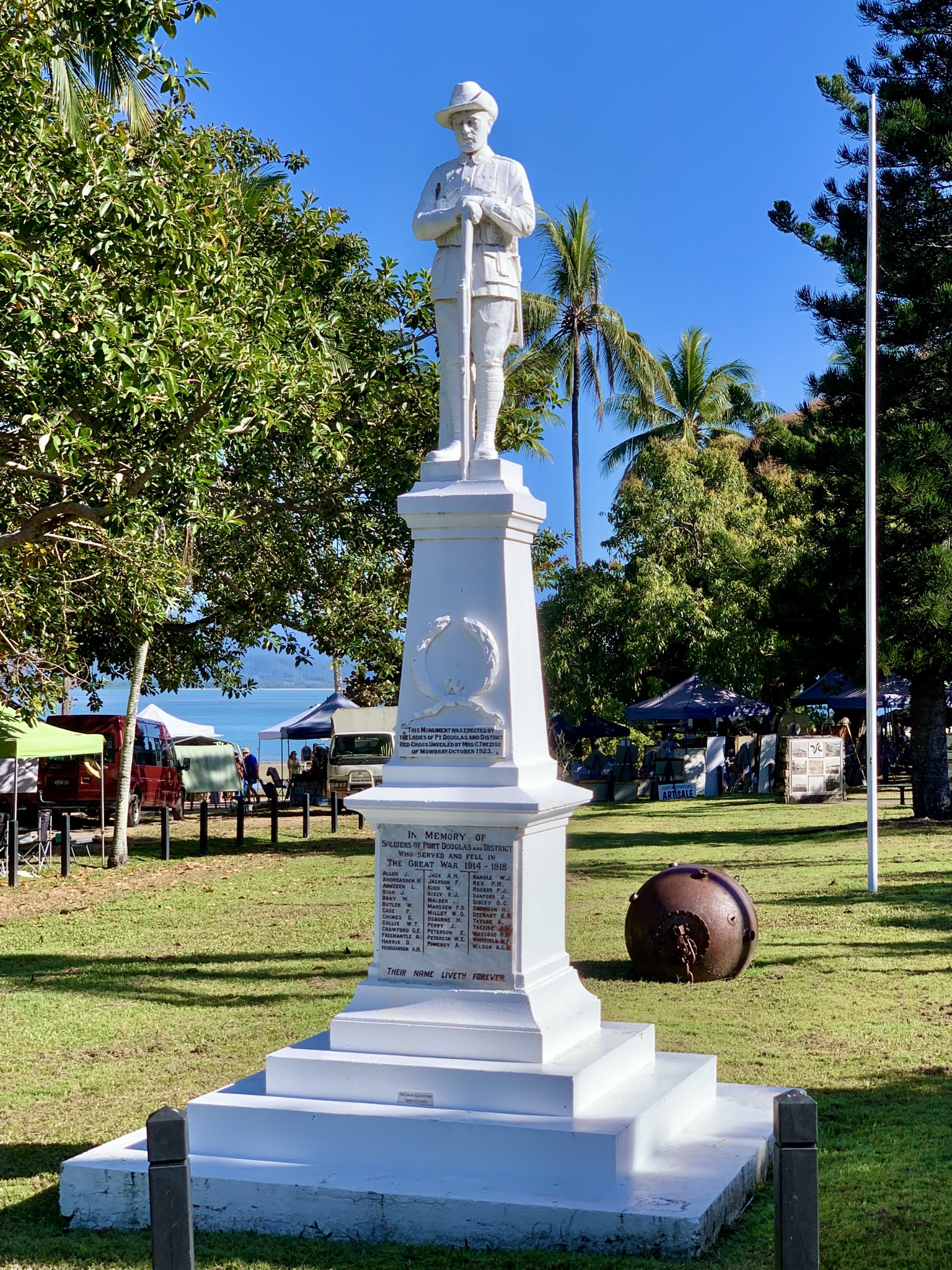
Port Douglas

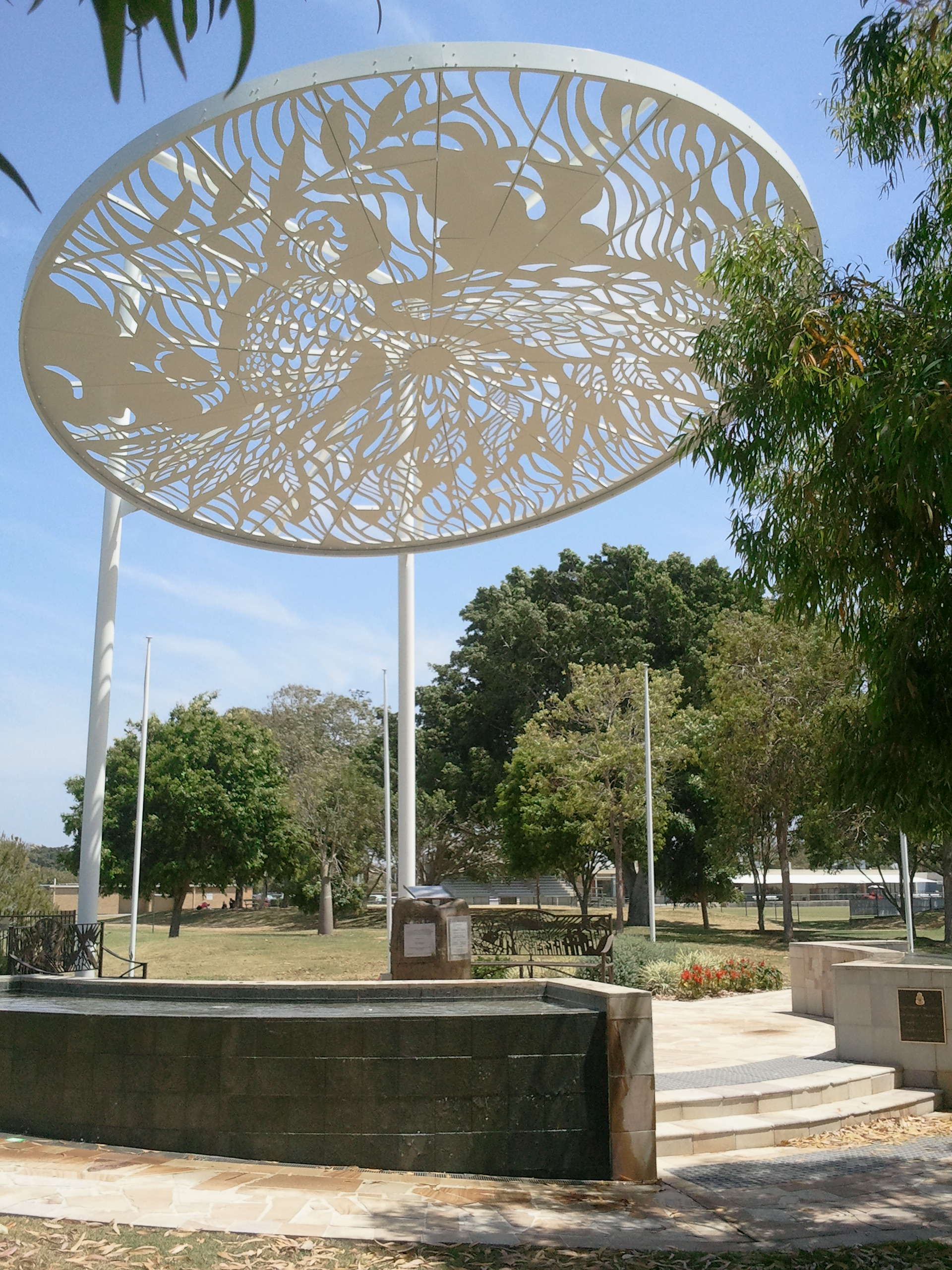
Runaway Bay

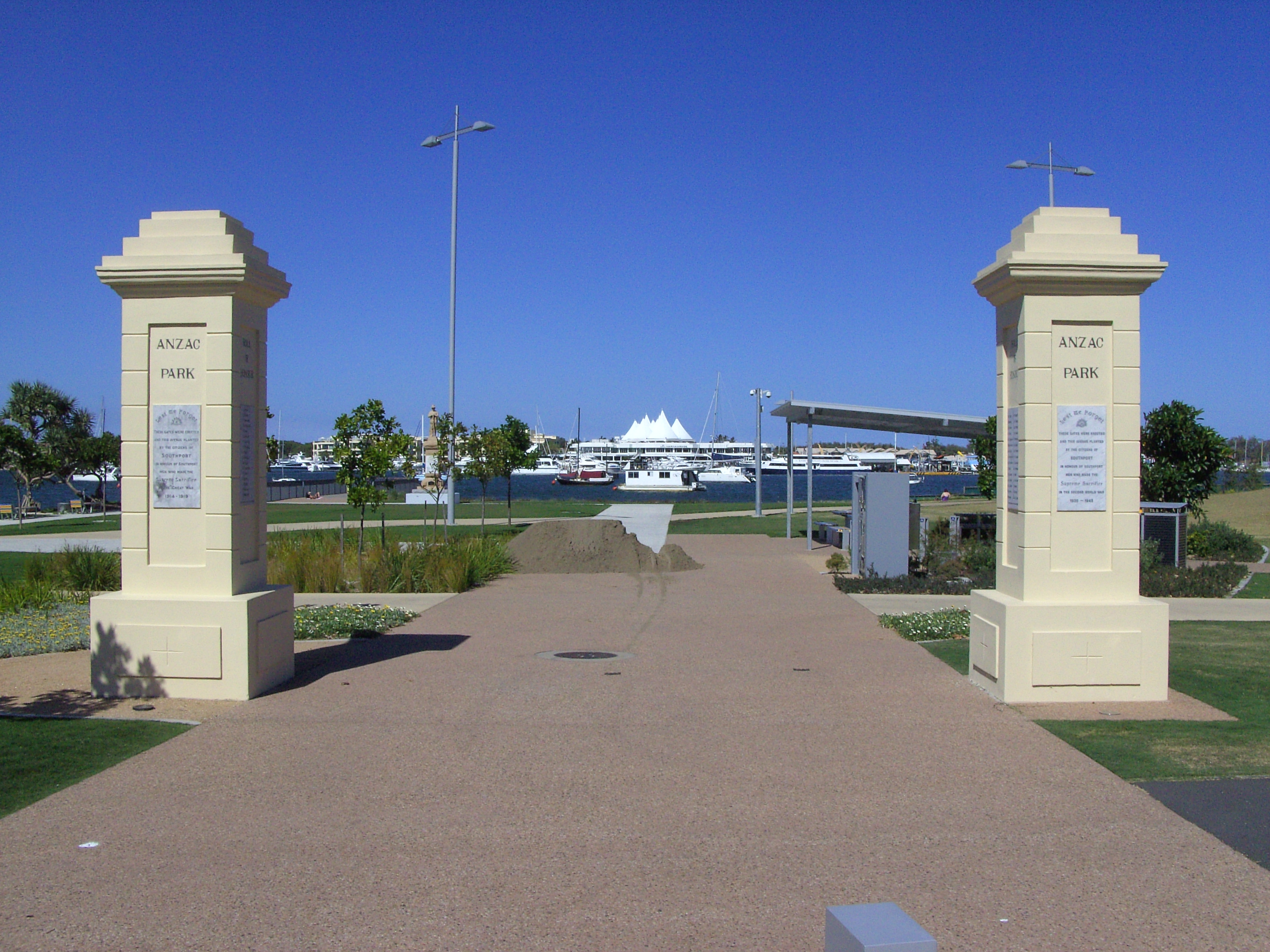
Southport (from 2010) - gates and statue

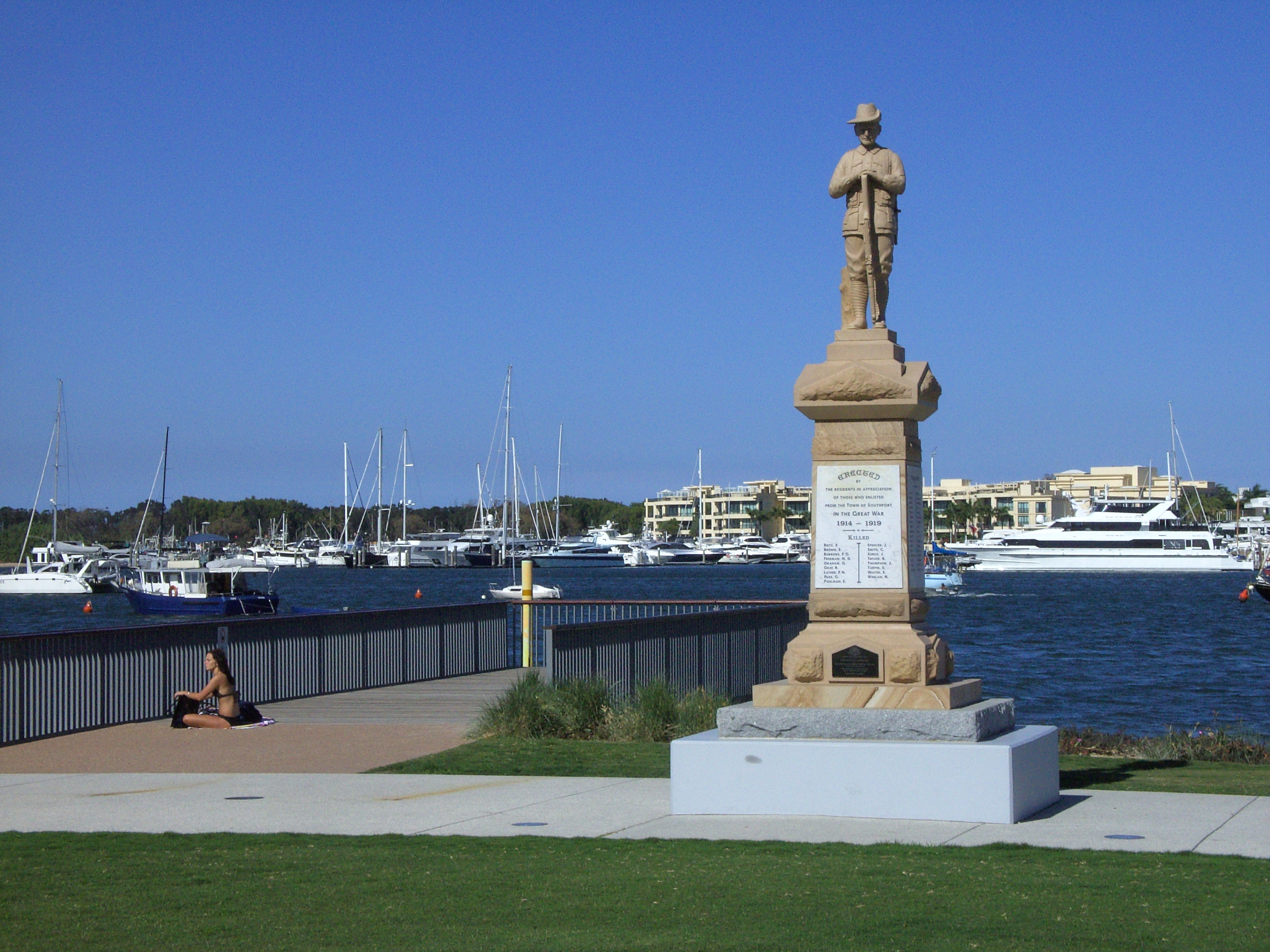
Southport (from 2010) - statue

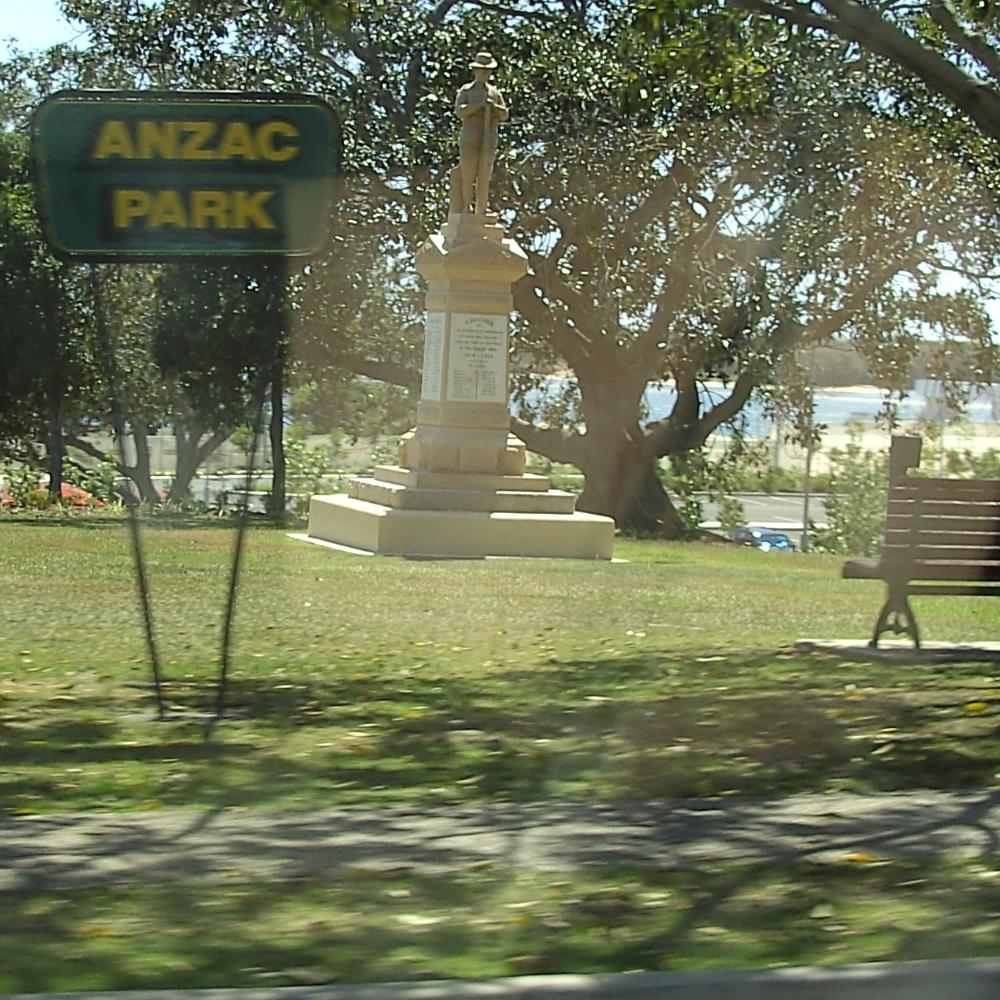
Southport (pre 2010)

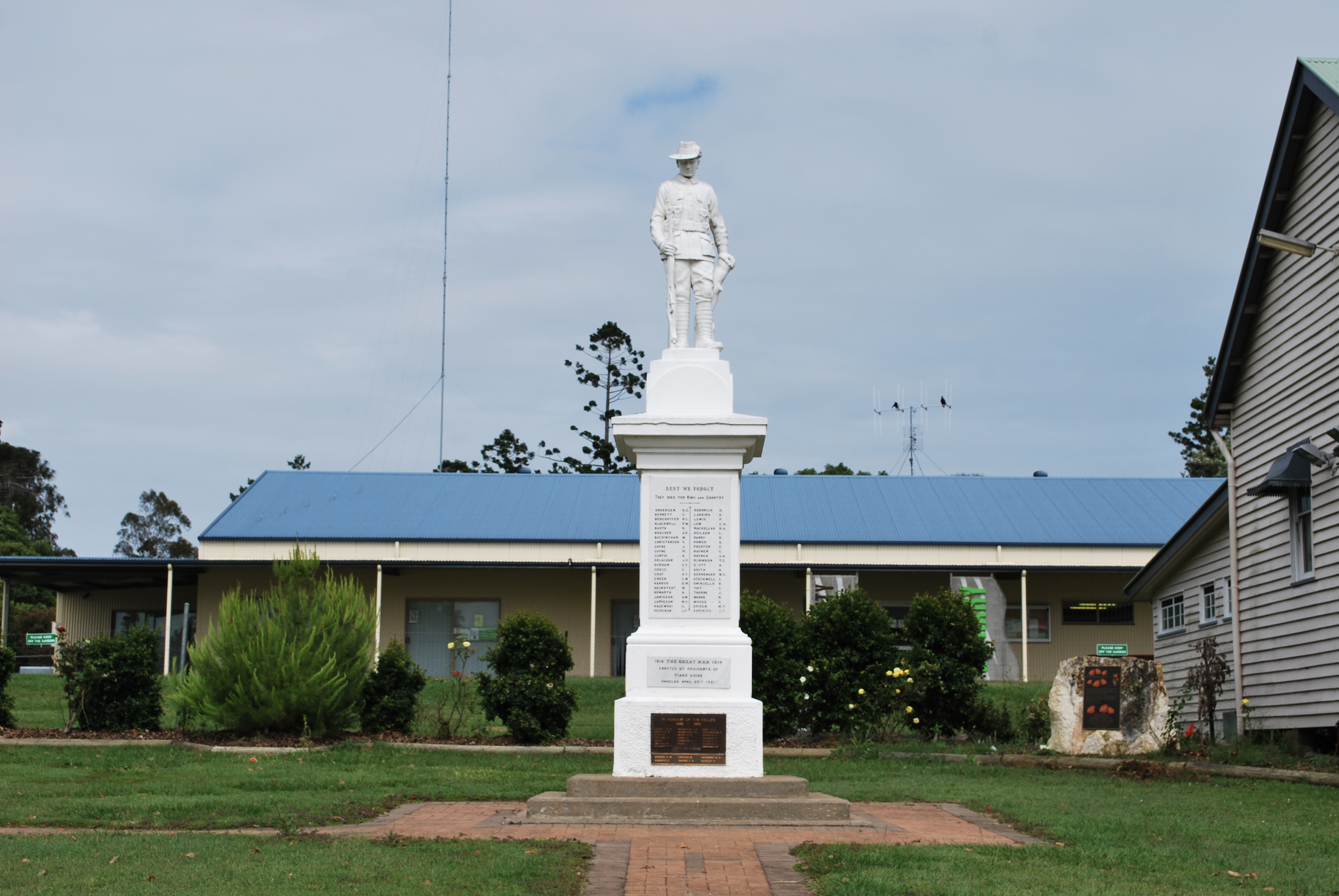
Tiaro

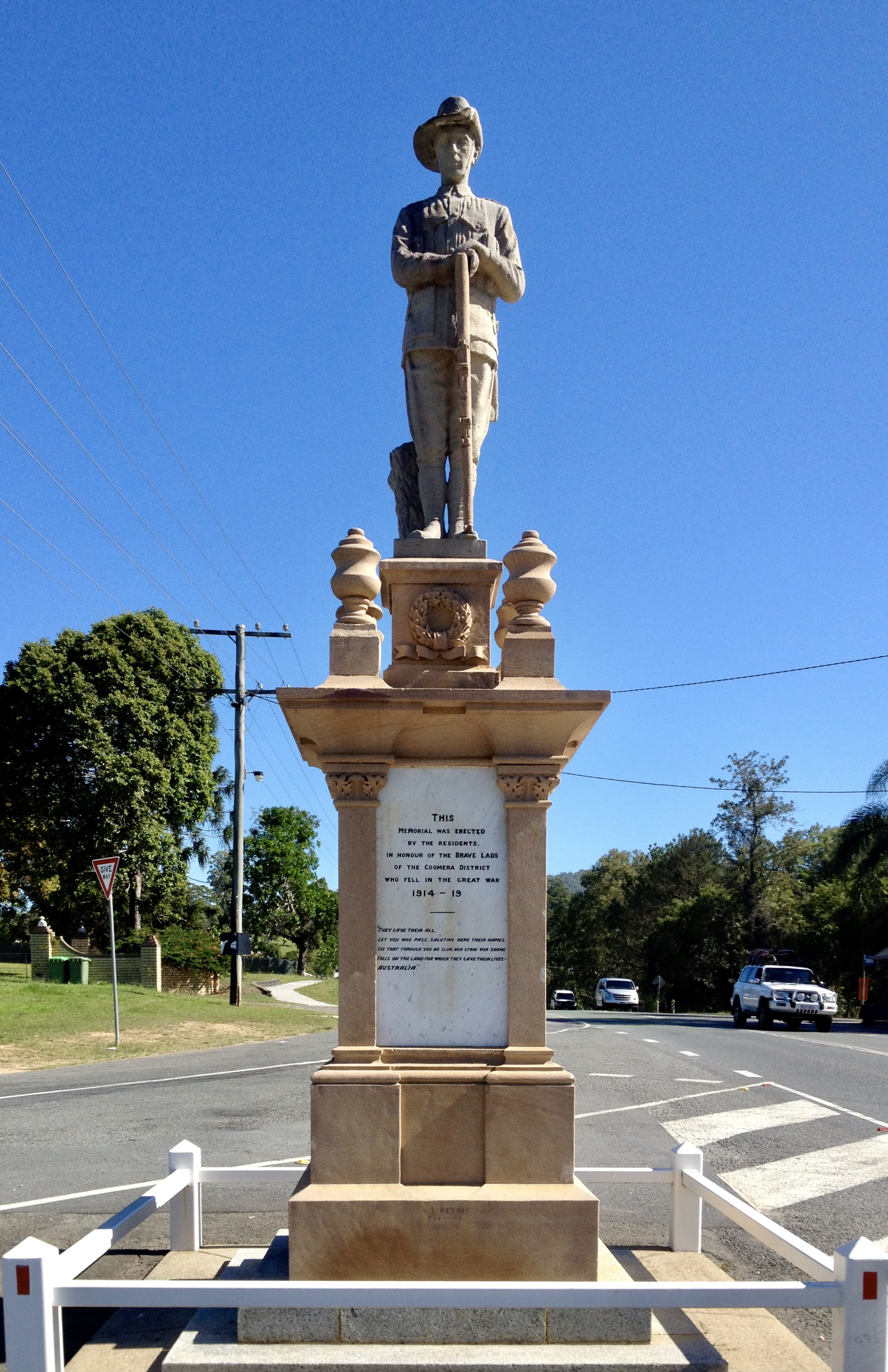
Upper Coomera

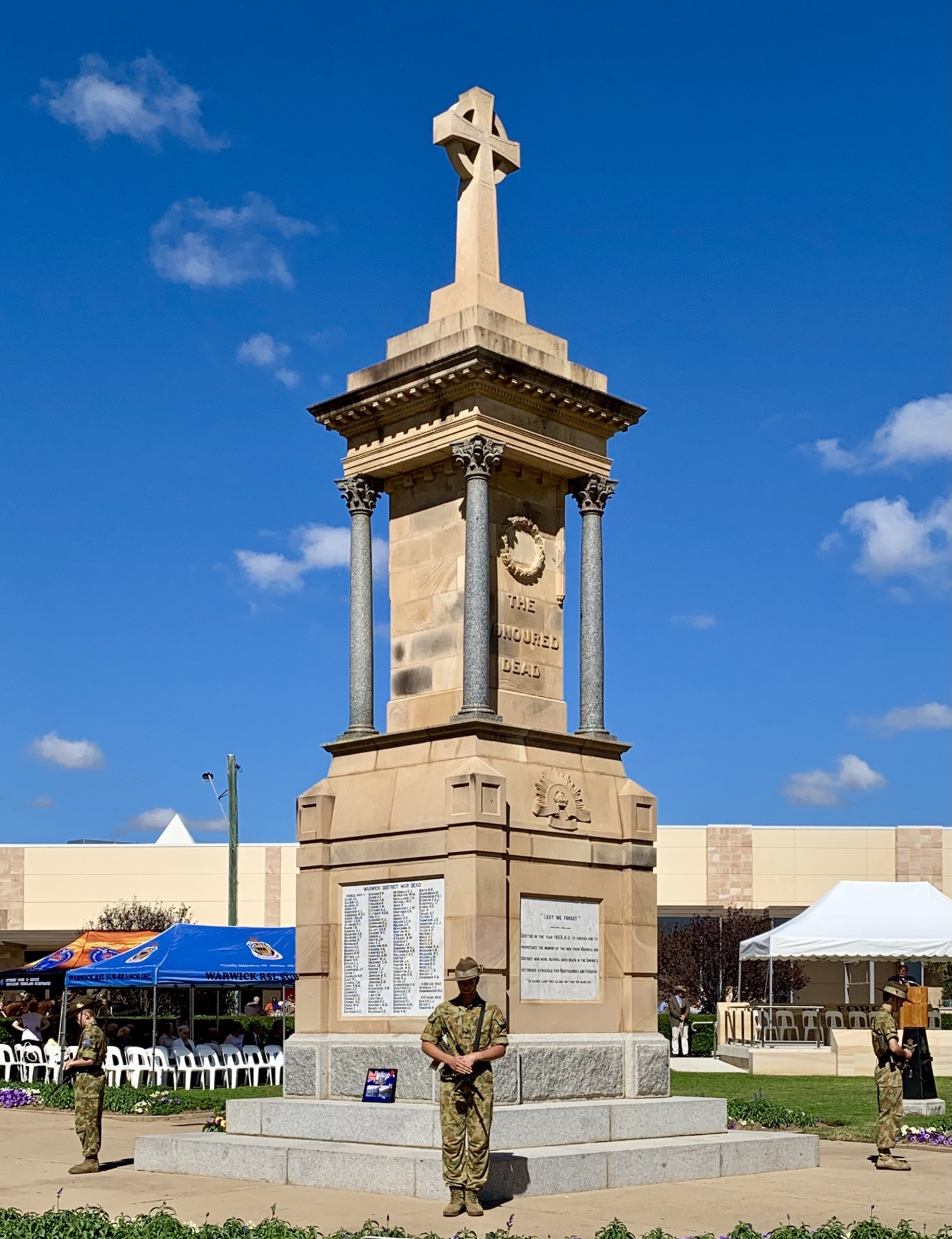
Warwick

== South Australia ==
| Memorial name | Location | Date established/ dedicated | Image | Honours | Notes |
|---|---|---|---|---|---|
| South African War Memorial | North Terrace, Adelaide | 1904 | | Boer War | Designed by sculptor Adrian Jones |
| National War Memorial | Cnr. North Terrace and Kintore Avenue, Adelaide | 25 April 1931 | | World War I | Designed: Woods, Bagot, Jory & Laybourne-Smith; Sculptures: Rayner Hoff |

== Tasmania ==
Tasmania has over 1000 war memorials, including memorial plantings and honour rolls.

| Memorial name | Location | Date established/ dedicated | Image | Honours | Notes |
|---|---|---|---|---|---|
| Hobart Cenotaph | Hobart | 13 December 1925 | | | |
| Ulverstone War Memorial | Ulverstone | | | | |
| West Ulverstone War Memorial | Ulverstone | | | | |
| Ross War Memorial | Ross | | | | |
| Bicheno War Memorial | Bicheno | | | | |
| Bicheno Memorial Gate | Bicheno | | | | |
| Cygnet Soldiers Memorial | Cygnet | | | | |
| Stanley War Memorial | Stanley | | | | |
| Burnie War Memorials | Stanley | | | | |
| Queenstown War Memorial | Queenstown | | | | |
| New Norfolk War Memorial | New Norfolk | | | | |
| Railton War Memorial | Railton | | | | |
| 99th Regiment Memorial | Hobart | | | | |
| Hagley War Memorial and Recreation Park | Hagley | | | | |
| Launceston Boer War Memorial | Launceston | | | | |
| Launceston War Memorial | Launceston | | | | |
| Legerwood Carved Memorial Trees | Legerwood | 15 October 1918 | | | |
| Ranelagh Soldiers Memorial Hall | Ranelagh | | | | |
| Sorell Memorial Hall | Sorell | | | | |
| Huonville War Memorial | Huonville | | | | |
| Primrose Sands War Memorial | Primrose Sands | | | | |

== Victoria ==
| Memorial name | Location | Date established/ dedicated | Image | Honours | Notes |
|---|---|---|---|---|---|
| | Bonnie Doon | | | | |
| | outside HMAS Cerberus, Crib Point | | | | |
| | Corryong | | | | |
| | Eildon | | | | |
| | Flinders | | | | |
| World War I memorial | Kalorama | | | World War I | |
| | Jamieson | | | | |
| | Mansfield | | | | |
| Shrine of Remembrance | Kings Domain, Melbourne | 11 November 1934 | | For the Australian soldiers of all wars post World War I | |
| | General Post Office, Melbourne | | | | |
| | Merrijig | | | | |
| Montrose Memorial and Garden | Montrose | | | | |
| Sassafras Memorial and Garden | Sassafras | | | | |
| Seymour Vietnam Veterans Memorial | Seymour | | | Vietnam War | |
| Torquay War Memorials | Torquay | | | | |
| War Memorial garden | Wangaratta | | | | |
| Yarra Glen Memorial and Hall | Yarra Glen | | | | |
| Australian Turkish Friendship Memorial | Kings Domain, Melbourne | | | Commemorates WWI fallen soldiers and is a tribute to Australian-Turkish relations | |

== Western Australia ==
As of 2015 there are more than 900 "war memorials and related objects" in Western Australia.

=== Perth metropolitan ===
- Axford Park memorial obelisk
- North Fremantle Fallen Soldiers' Memorial
- East Fremantle Roll of Honour

==== Kings Park ====
Kings Park in Perth includes several war memorials.

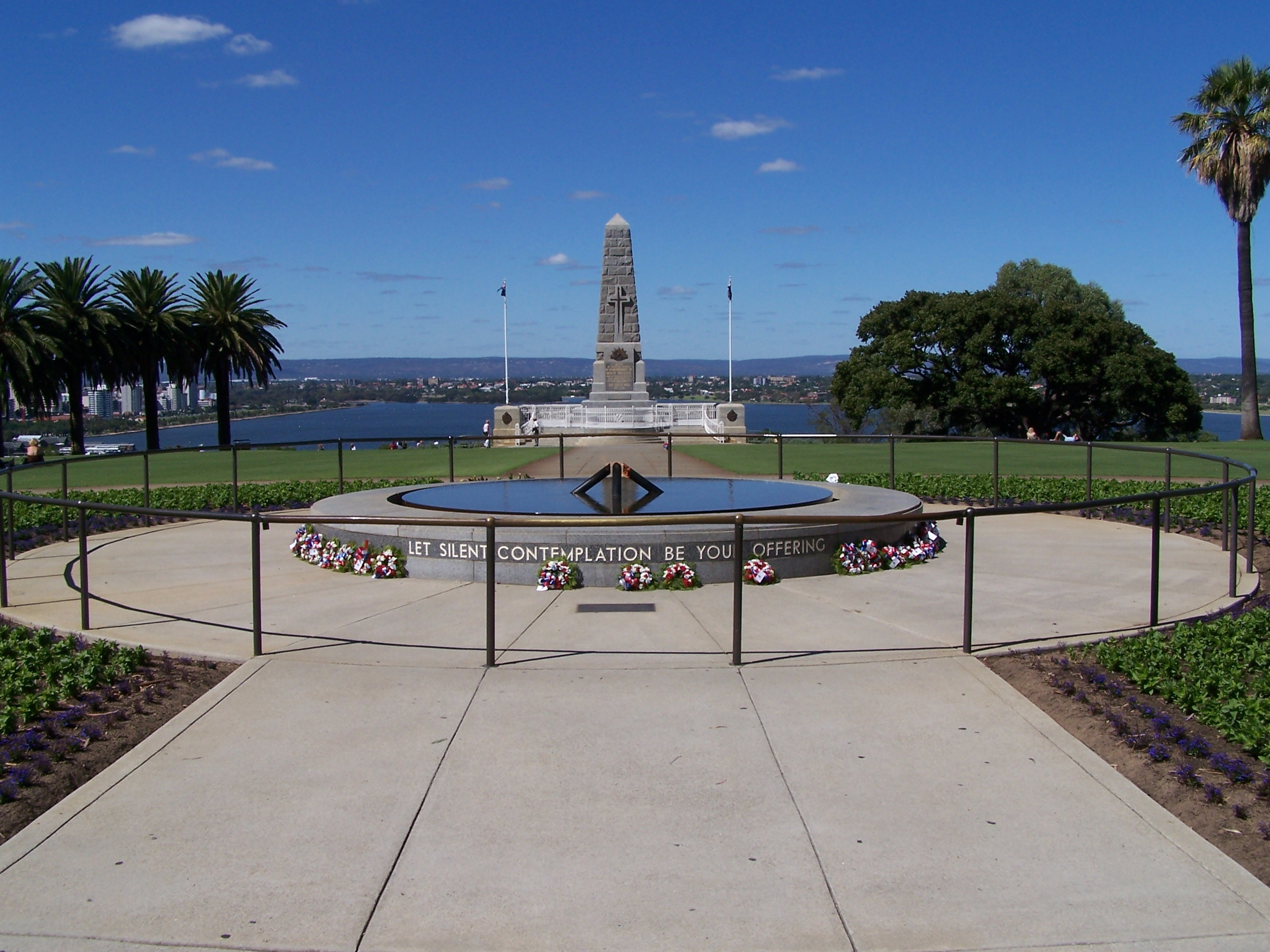
State War Memorial
- Tobruk War Memorial
- Vietnam War Memorial
- Kings Park has several "honour avenues". These avenues are lined with trees, each tree having been planted in the memory of an individual who died in the war. A plaque in front of the tree identifies each person.

==== Monument Hill, Fremantle ====
The Monument Hill Memorial Reserve on High Street has several memorials.

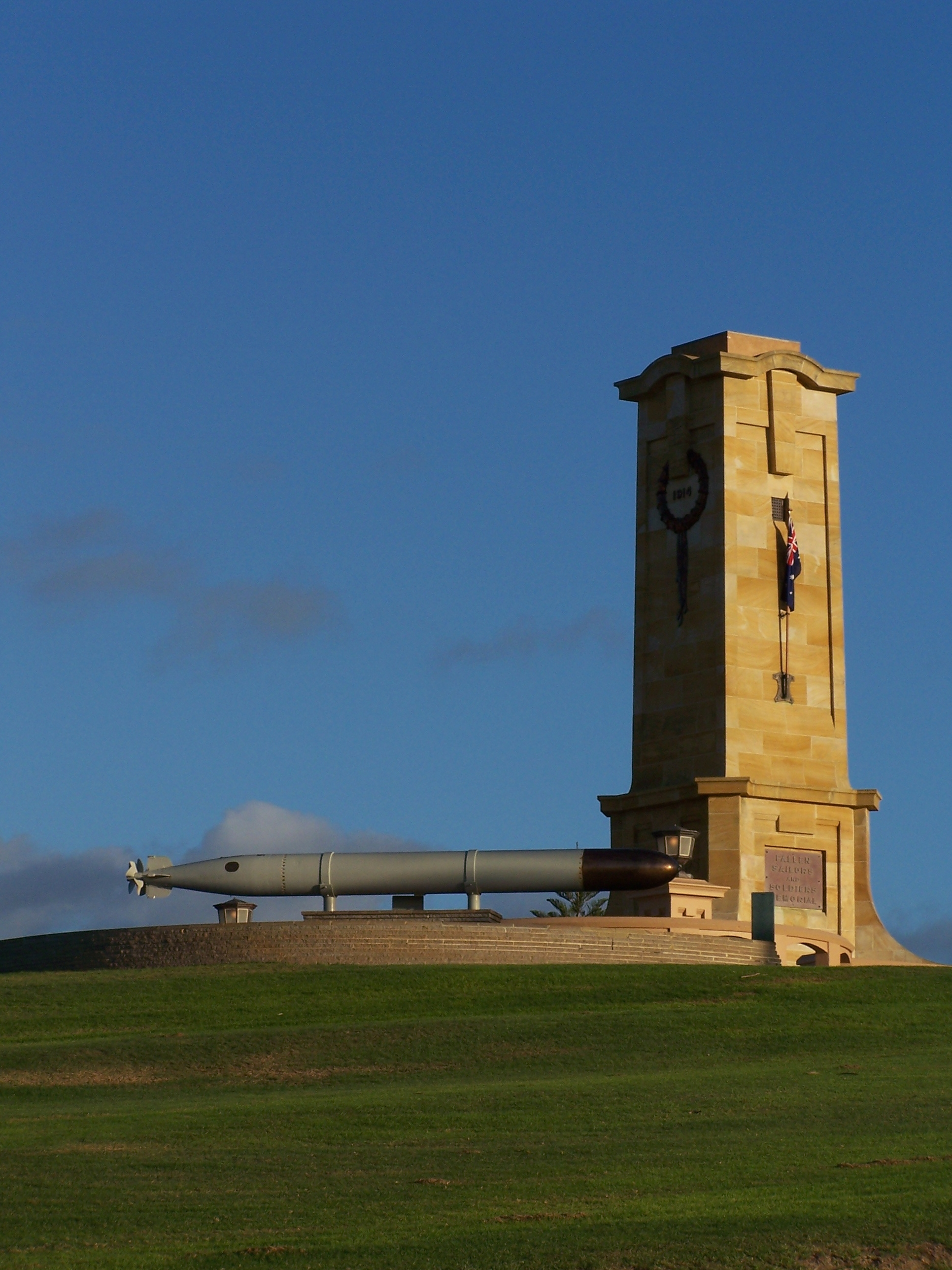
Fremantle War Memorial or Fallen Soldiers' and Sailors' Memorial
- Merchant Navy Memorial
- Royal Australian Navy in Vietnam Memorial
- RAN Corvettes Memorial
- United States Submariners' Memorial

=== Rockingham ===
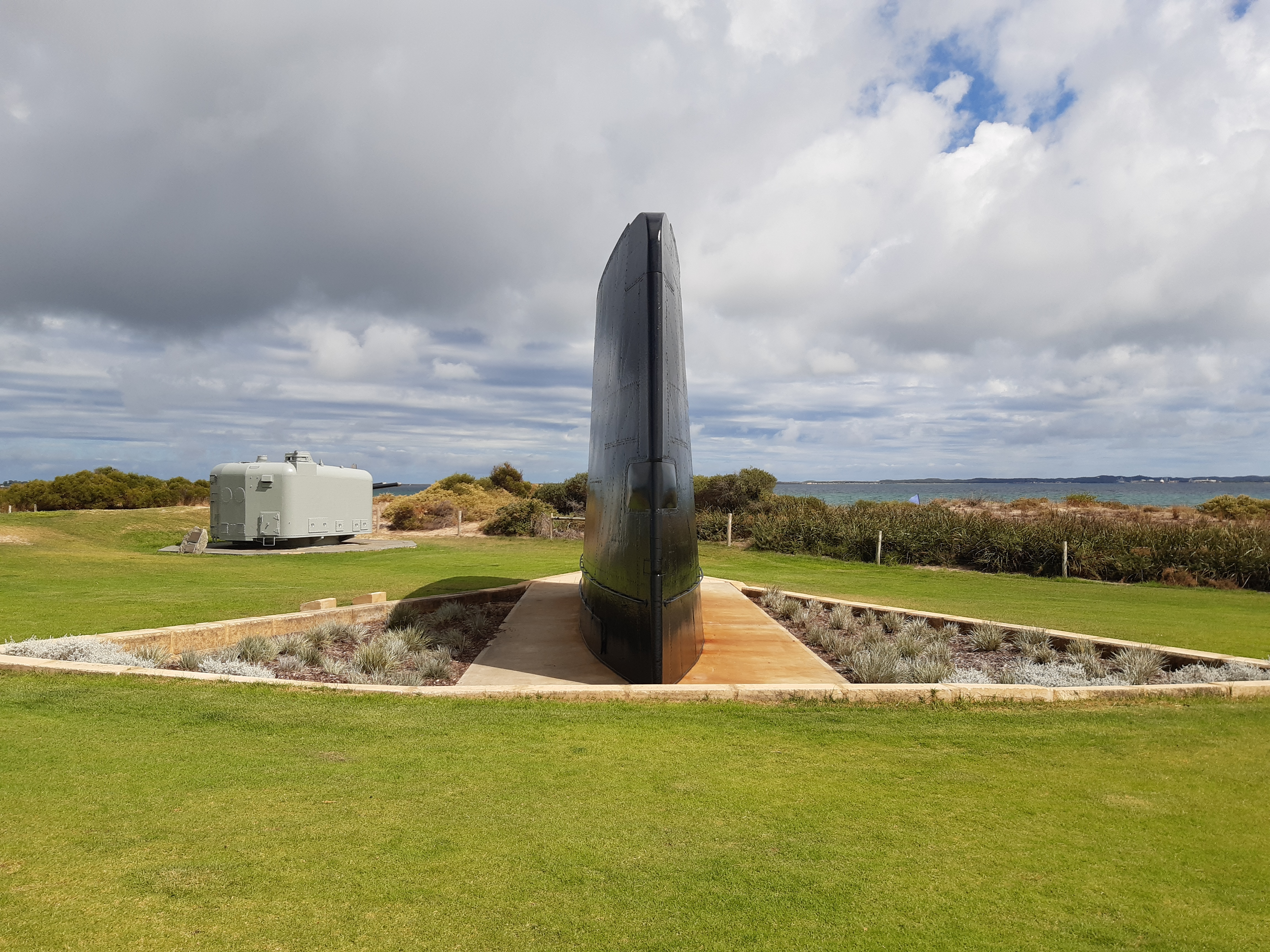
HMAS Orion fin and HMAS Derwent gun turret at Naval Memorial Park

The Rockingham Naval Memorial Park, opened in 1996, is dedicated to the Royal Australian Navy and its activities during World War II, the Korean War and the Vietnam War. The memorial consists of three main parts, a walk way with commemorative plaques, the HMAS Orion fin and the HMAS Derwent gun turret.

The Rockingham War Memorial, opened in 2005, commemorates Australian servicemen and women from the district who died in service or were killed in action in conflicts involving Australia.

=== Albany ===
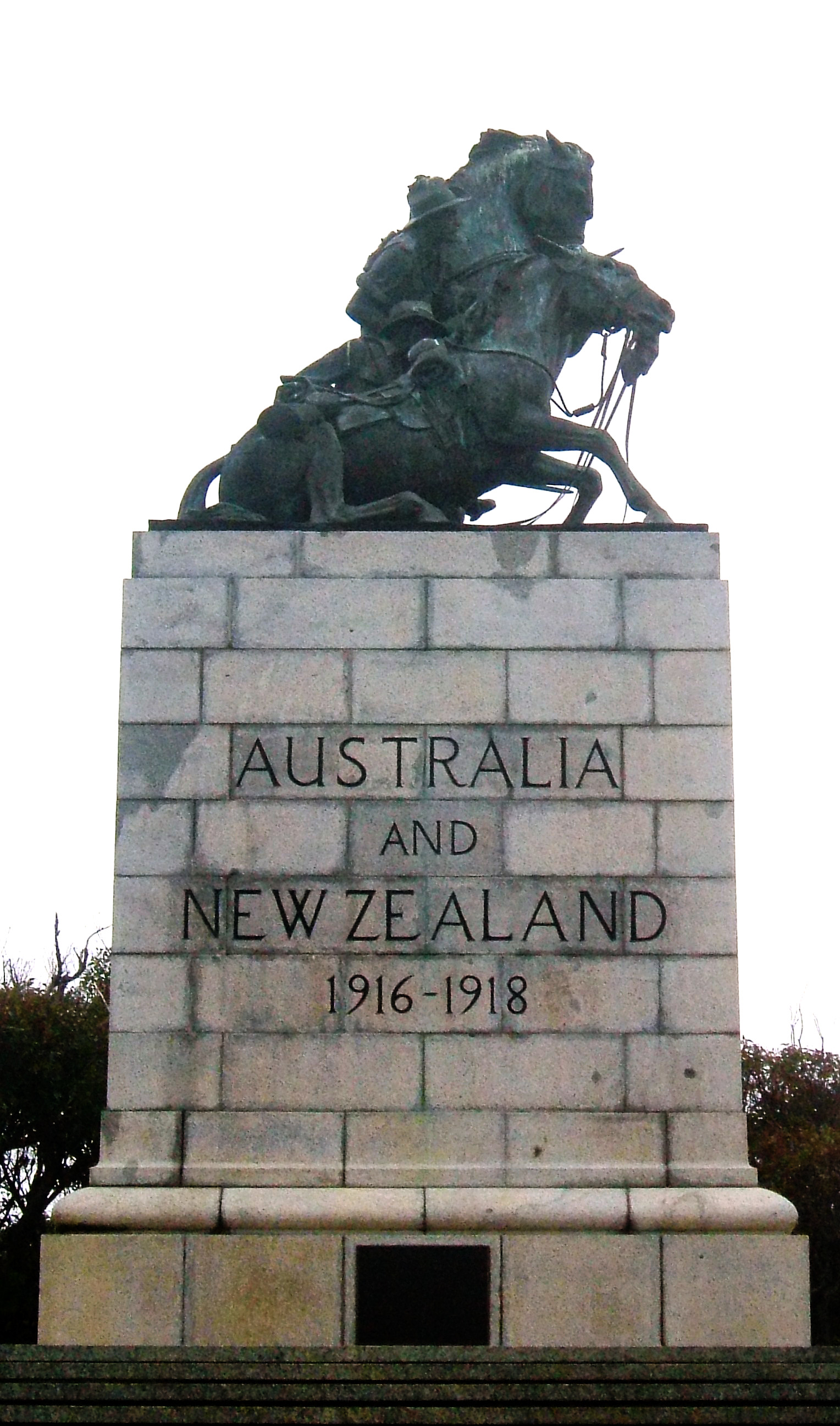
Desert Mounted Corps Memorial on Mount Clarence

Albany has several memorials.

- Albany War Memorial
- Anzac Peace Park
- Apex Drive Honour Avenue
- Mustafa Kemal Atatürk statue and Atatürk Entrance
- The Desert Mounted Corps Memorial on Mount Clarence
- RSL Nurses' Memorial Garden
- The Gallipoli Pine, Mount Clarence
- The South East Asia memorial in the Princess Royal Fortress
- National Anzac Centre, including the "Still On Patrol" memorial and the Merchant Navy Memorial

== Outside of Australia ==
- Australian Memorial Park – France
- Australian War Memorial, London – England
- Mont Saint-Quentin Australian war memorial – France
- V.C. Corner Australian Cemetery and Memorial – France
- Villers–Bretonneux Australian National Memorial – France

== See also ==
- Military Memorials of National Significance in Australia
- Virtual War Memorial Australia
