= Alison Creagh =

Retired Australian Army officer

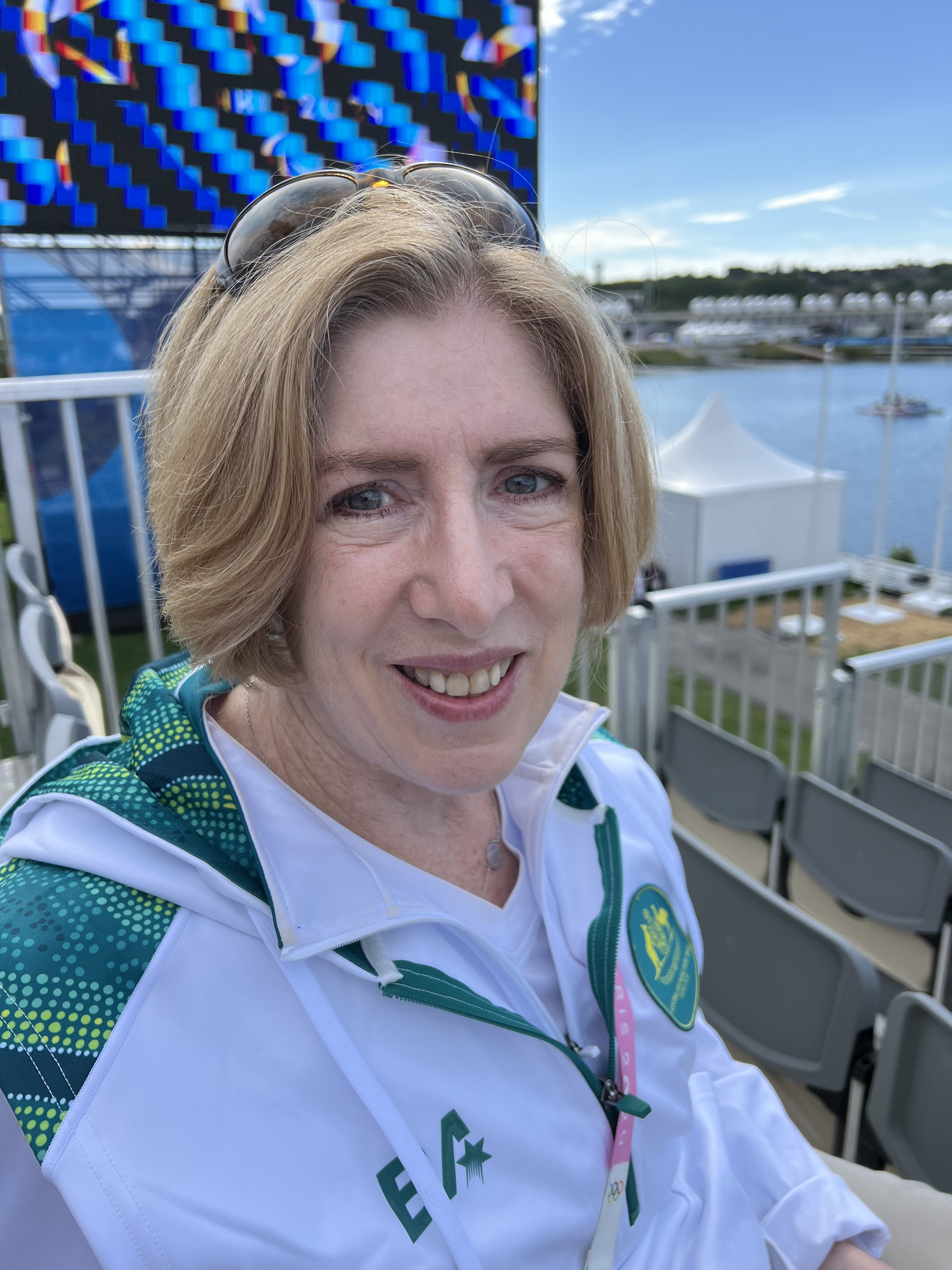
- Creagh in September 2024
- Born: 1962 (age 63–64)
- Military career
- Allegiance: Australia
- Branch: Australian Army Reserve; Australian Army
- Service years: 1981–2015
- Rank: Brigadier
- Commands: 145th Signal Squadron
- Conflicts: United Nations Transitional Authority in Cambodia; International Force East Timor; Iraq War; War in Afghanistan
- Awards: Member of the Order of Australia; Conspicuous Service Cross; NATO Meritorious Service Medal
- Other work: President of Paralympics Australia (2023–25)

Brigadier Alison Margaret Creagh, AM, CSC (born 1962) is a retired Australian Army officer. After seeing active service with the Australian Army in Cambodia, East Timor, Iraq and Afghanistan, she was involved in the creation of the Australian Peacekeeping Memorial on Anzac Parade, Canberra. She was president of the Paralympics Australia from September 2023 to June 2025.

== Early life ==
Alison Margaret Creagh was born in 1962. She moved to Canberra a few years later after when her father became a member of the academic staff at the Royal Military College, Duntroon. She was educated at Canberra Girls Grammar School and the Australian National University.

== Military career ==
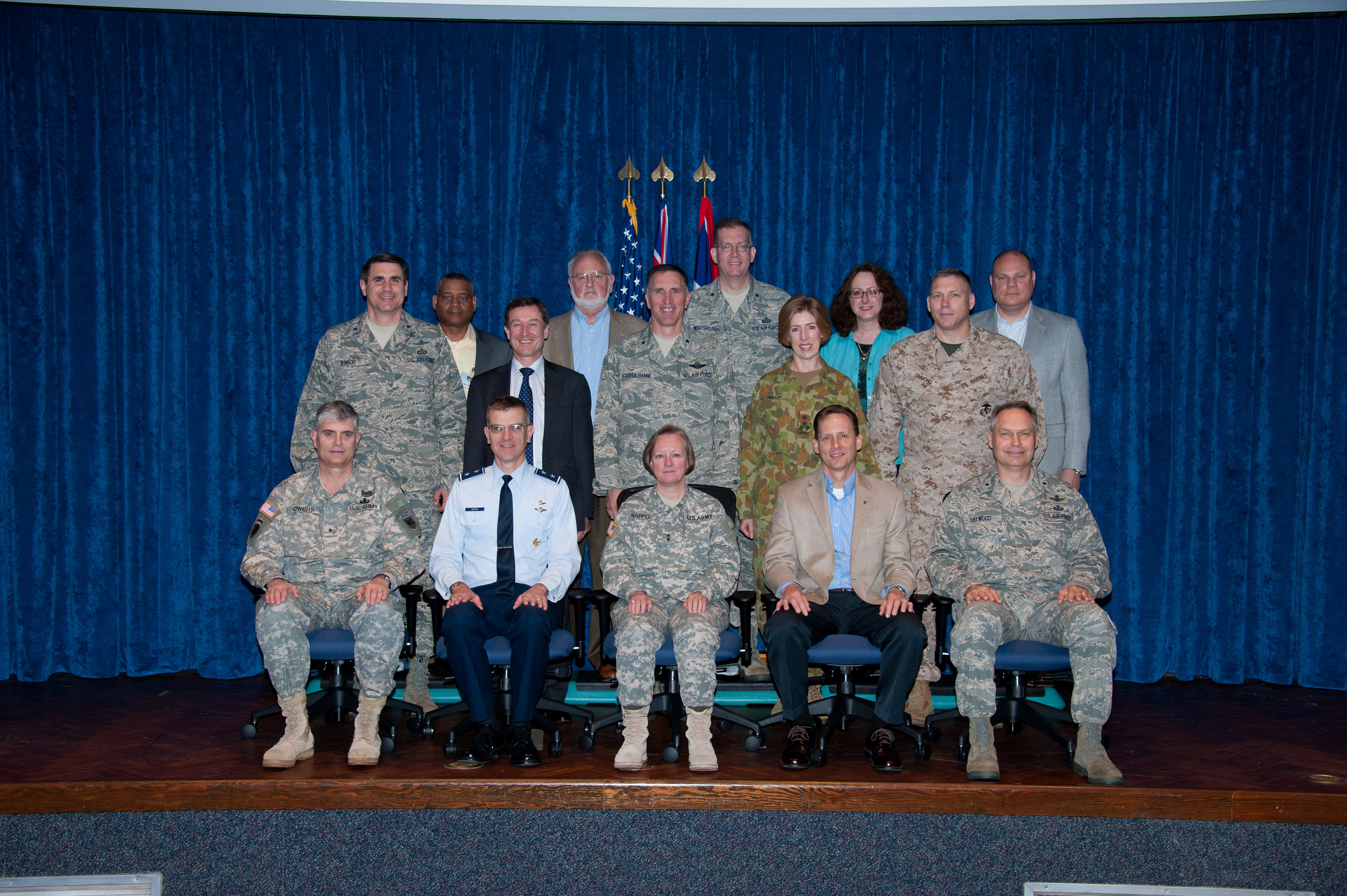
Senior Joint Information Operations Applications course 12B in 2012. Creagh is in the middle row, second from the right

Creagh joined the Australian Army Reserve in 1981, followed by the Australian Regular Army four years later. She graduated from the Officer Cadet School, Portsea, in Victoria, and was commissioned into the Australian Army Signal Corps. She served in Cambodia in 1993 as the quartermaster of the Force Communications Unit with the United Nations Transitional Authority in Cambodia (UNTAC), for which she was awarded the Conspicuous Service Cross.

In 1999, Creagh became the second-in-command of the 1st Joint Support Unit and commanded the 145th Signal Squadron in East Timor as part of the International Force East Timor (INTERFET). She served in Iraq in 2006 and with the headquarters of the International Security Assistance Force (ISAF) in Afghanistan for nine months in 2008 and 2009, for which she was awarded the NATO Meritorious Service Medal. She was the Director-General of Public Affairs in 2010, the Director-General, Strategic Communication, from 2011 to 2013, and the Director-General, Australian Defence Force Theatre Project, from 2013 to 2014. She retired from the Australian Regular Army with the rank of brigadier in 2015, and became a reservist once more.

== Post-military career ==
Creagh became a non-executive director and chair of the board of governors of The Road Home, Veterans' organisation, in 2014. She was a council member of the Australian War Memorial from 2015 to 2018, and the executive director of the Spirit of Anzac Centenary Experience in 2015. She was vice-chair of the Australian Peacekeeping Memorial Project from 2016 to 2019, which resulted in the creation of the Australian Peacekeeping Memorial on Anzac Parade, Canberra, which was inaugurated in 2017. She was chair of the ACT Ministerial Advisory Committee for Veterans and their Families and was a Defence Ambassador for the ACT Government. She was a strategic adviser at the Defence Research Institute at the University of New South Wales in Canberra from 2018 to 2019, and has been an adjunct lecturer there since 2017.

A founding member of the ADF Rowing Association, Creagh became president of Rowing ACT in 2019, and was the ACT councillor for Rowing Australia. She was the assistant indoor rowing coach of the Australian Team at the 2018 Invictus Games. She is a Level 1 rowing coach and an accredited national and international para-rowing classifier. She became a Member of the Order of Australia in the 2020 Queen's Birthday Honours "for significant service to veterans and their families, and to rowing." In June 2022, she was appointed to the board of Paralympics Australia, and was president from September 2023 to June 2025.
