= Ante Dabro =

Croatian Australian sculptor

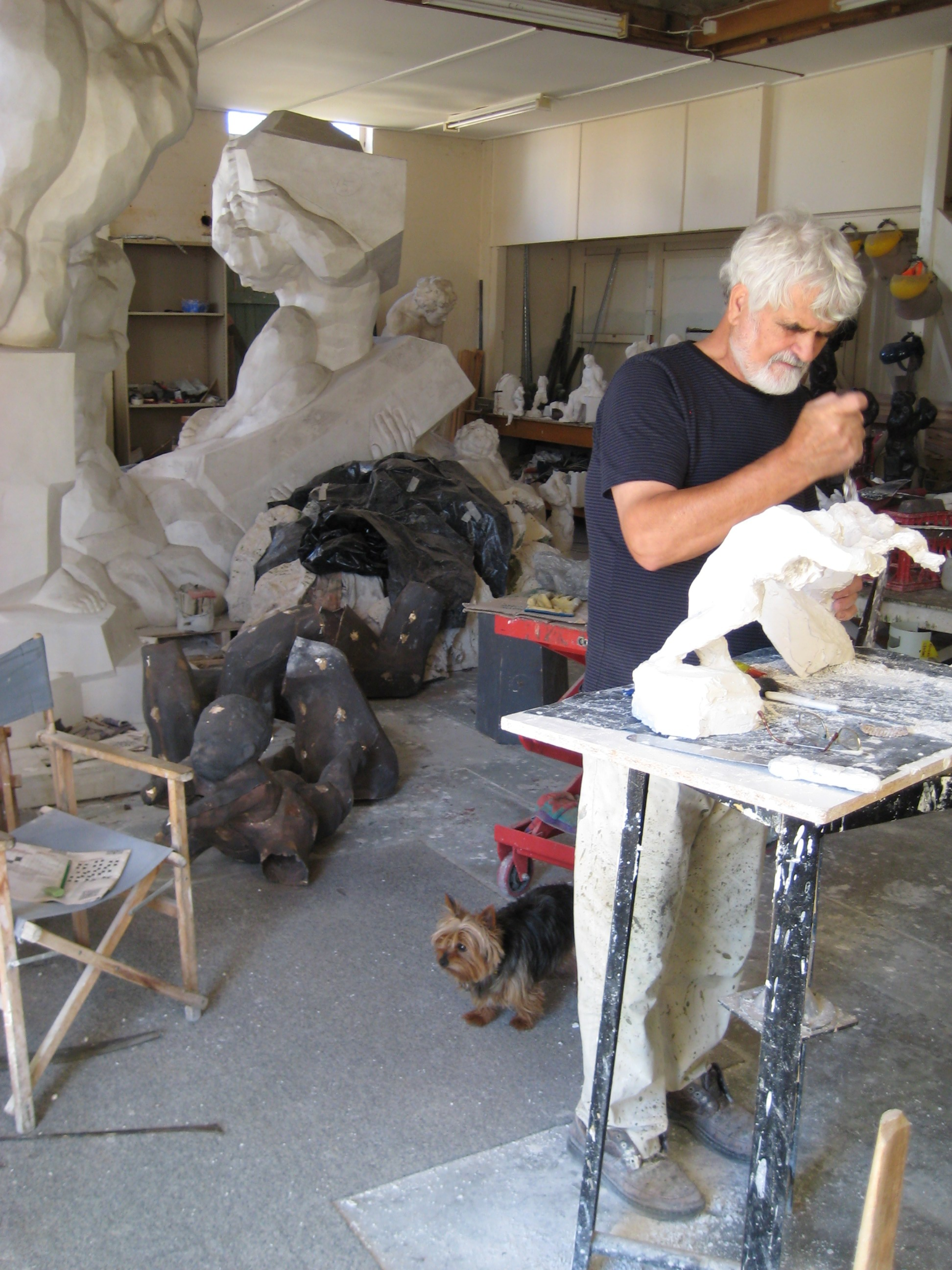
Ante Dabro at work in his studio at Canberra Airport, 2011. Behind (L-R) are the full sized models for "Genesis", "Resilience", the unassembled pieces of "Mother and Child", and his Australian Silky Terrier, Chico.

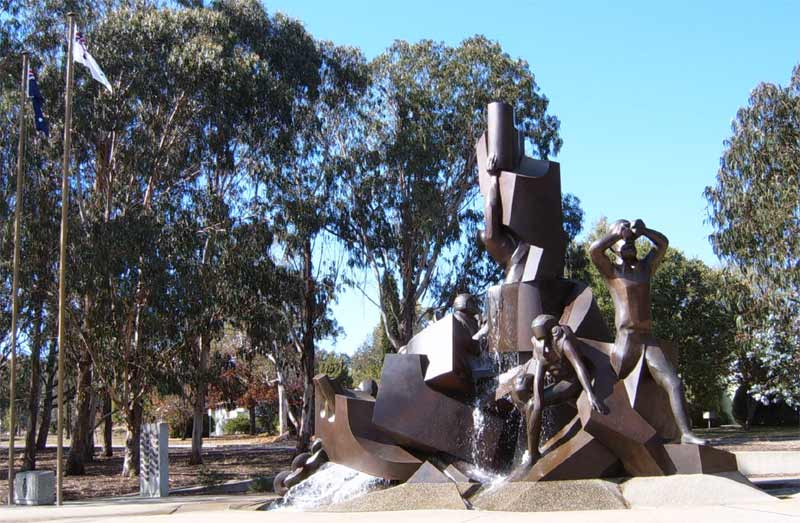
Royal Australian Navy Memorial, Anzac Parade, Canberra

Ante Dabro (born 13 January 1938, Čavoglave, Croatia) is a Croatian-born Australian artist/sculptor and art teacher who has lived and worked in Canberra, Australian Capital Territory since the late 1960s.

Dabro's sculptures are typified by angular form; many are nudes and bronzes. His work is said to embody universal themes, "suffering, hope, sexuality, heroism, spirituality" but also silently acknowledge the 'outsider'.

He is the subject of the 2023 biography The Life and Work of Ante Dabro, Australian-Croatian Sculptor: The Midnight Sea in the Blood by Peter Read (historian).

== Principal works ==
A selection of Dabro's works are listed:

- Royal Australian Navy Memorial, Canberra - Sailors and Ships - Interaction and Interdependence (1986), unveiled by Queen Elizabeth II on 1986-03-03, the 75th anniversary of the Navy.
- Australian National University:
  - Contemplation (2002) - a response to the poetry of Judith Wright
  - Sir Winston Churchill (2001) - Winston Churchill Trust
- Brindabella Business Park, Canberra Airport; these are in the collection of the airport's owner, Terry Snow, and are on loan to BBP:
  - four bronzes at water features, Susanne, Dancer, and The Bathers, all dated 2005
  - a bronze figure Genesis (2009), unveiled 2009-06-02 by the Governor General of Australia, Quentin Bryce.
- Canberra City
  - "Resilience" (2009)
- Saint Matthew, (1984), St Matthew's Roman Catholic Church, Page, ACT
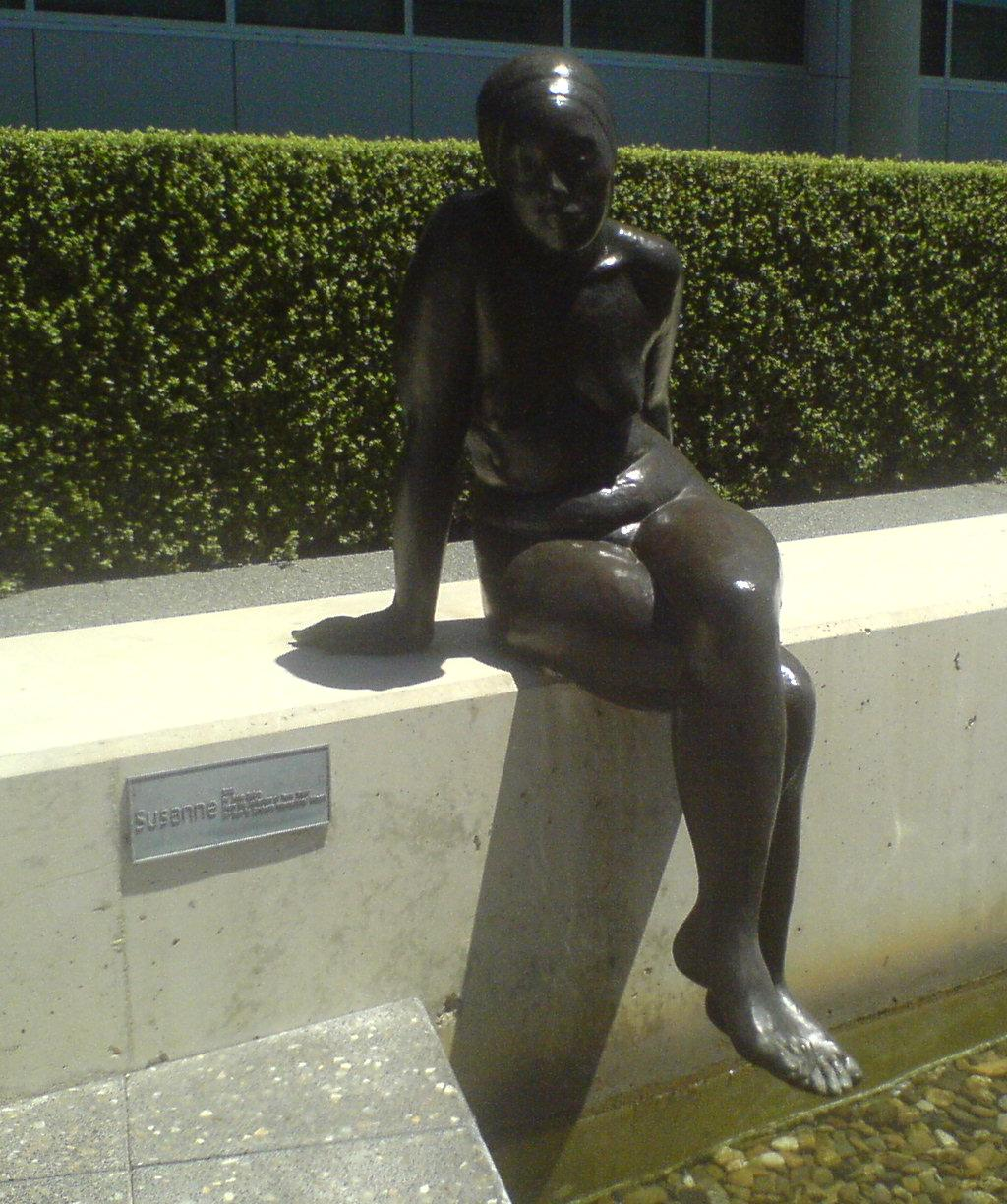
Susanne (2005), life-sized bronze nude, sits on a wall beside a reflecting pond, BBP.

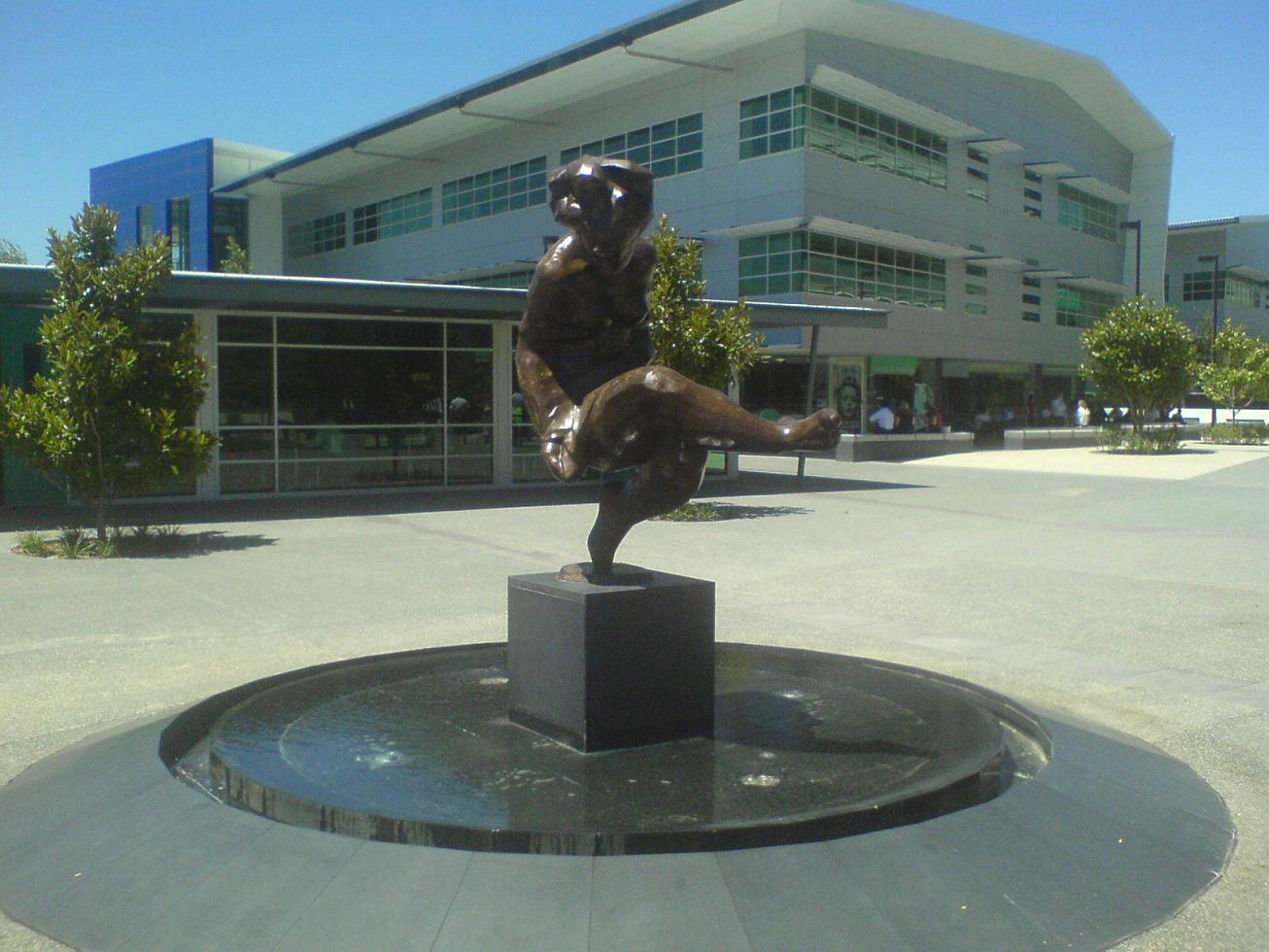
Dancer (2005), 1.5 life-sized bronze nude, in a reflecting pool, BBP.

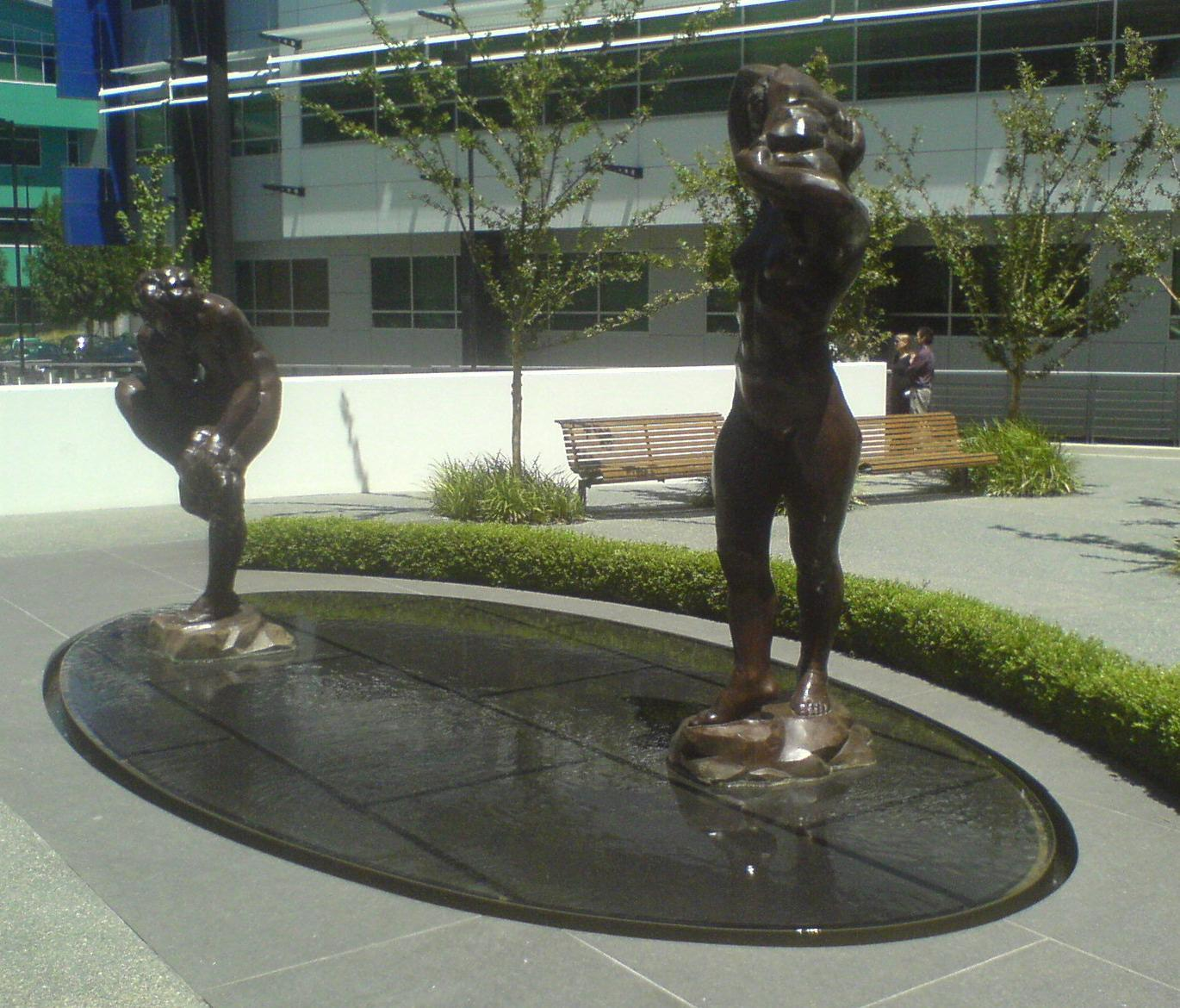
The Bathers (2005), two 1.5 life-sized bronze nudes, in a reflecting pool, BBP.

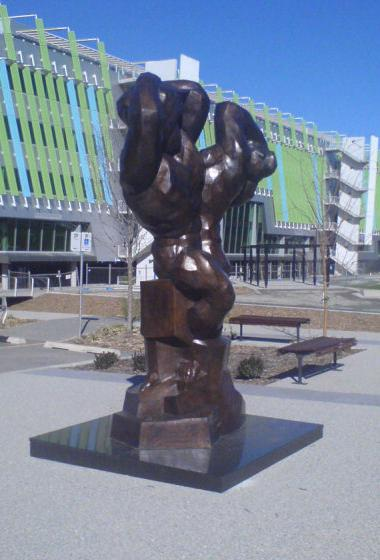
Genesis (2008/9); 1.5 life-sized bronze nude, eastern end of BBP.

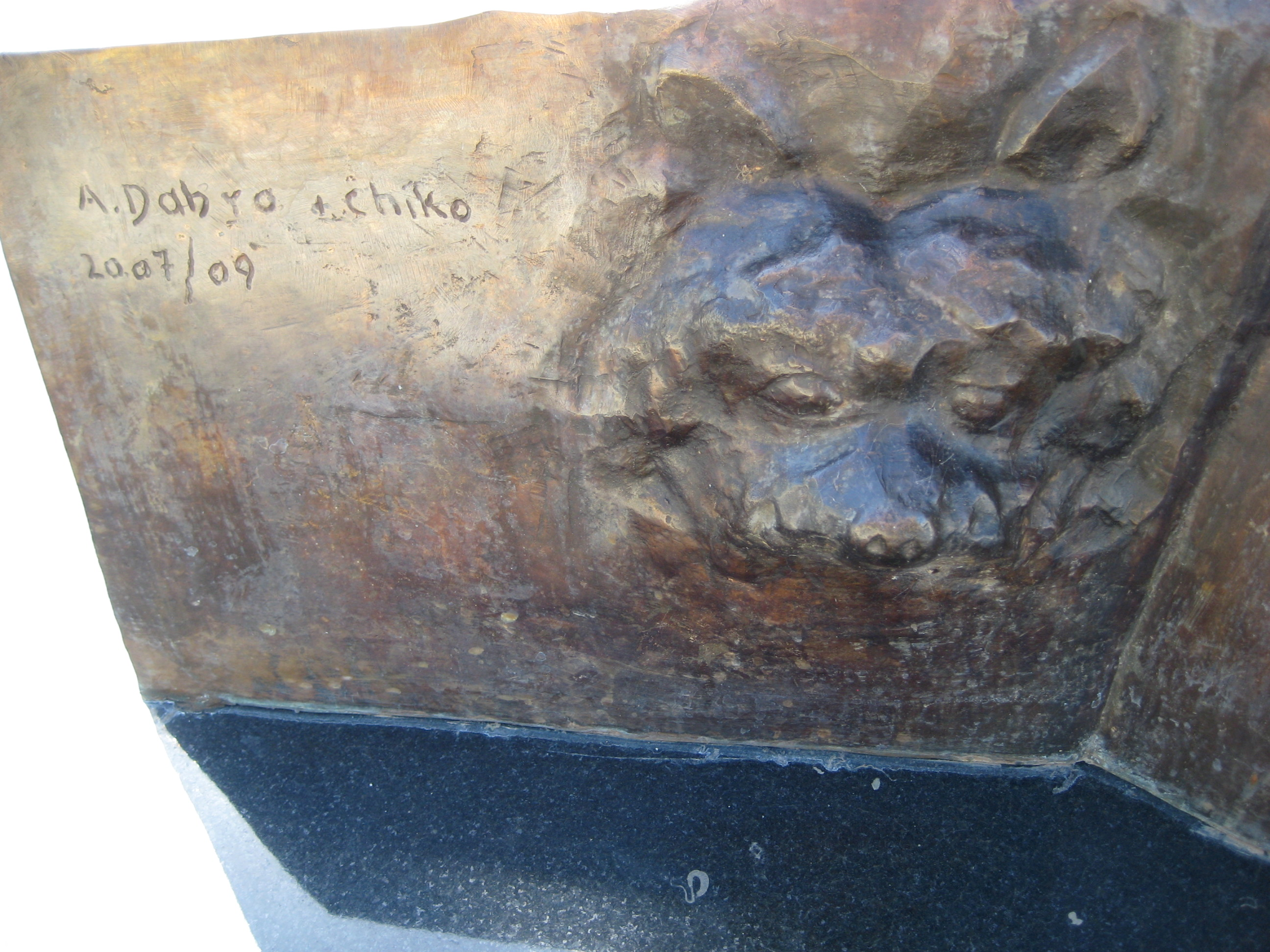
Genesis signature incorporating the face of Chiko (Australian Silky Terrier)

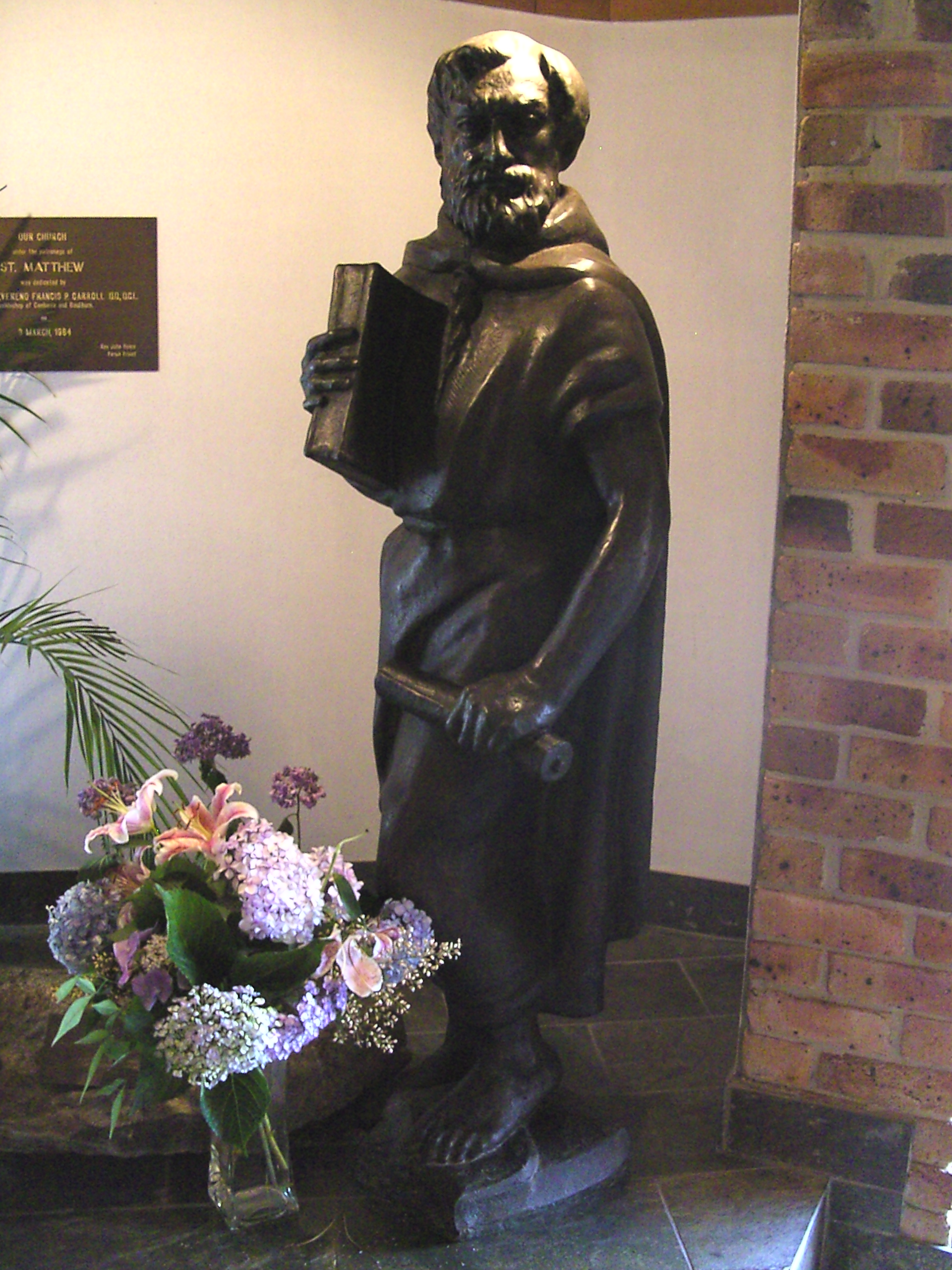
St Matthew, (1984); life-size bronze.

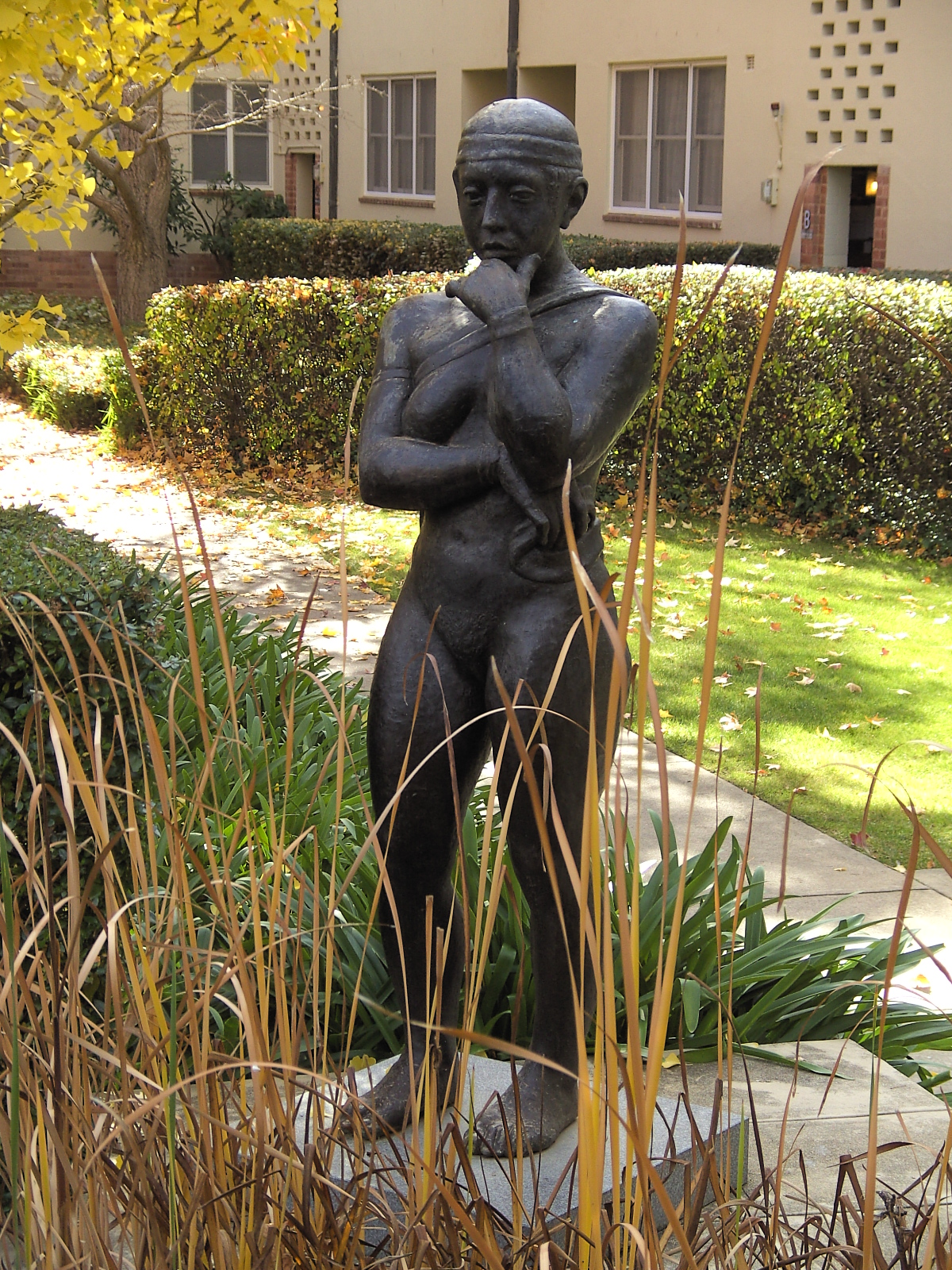
Standing figure, (1981–82); 3/4-to-full life size bronze.

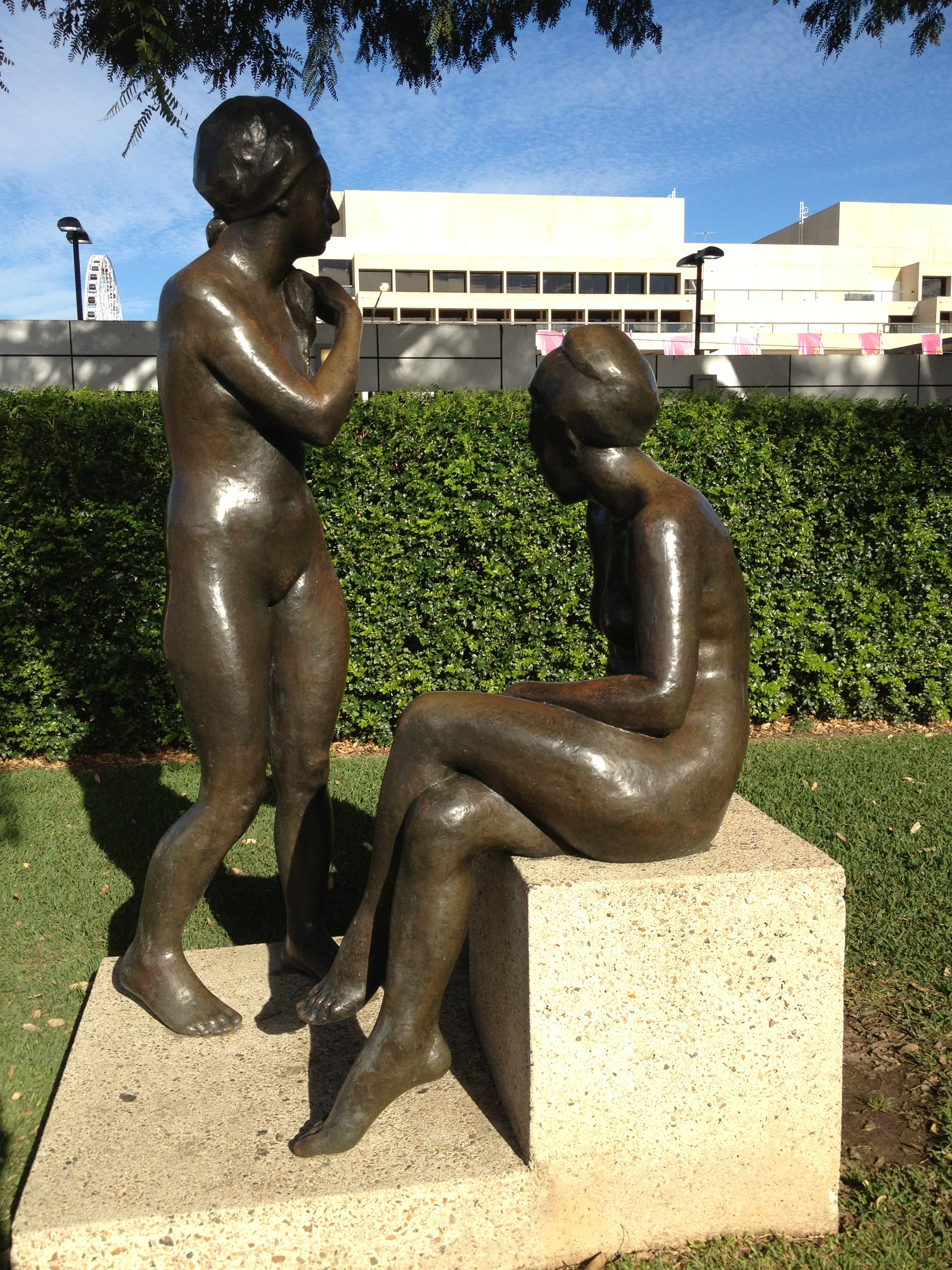
Sisters , (1985), two life-sized bronze nudes, Queensland Art Gallery

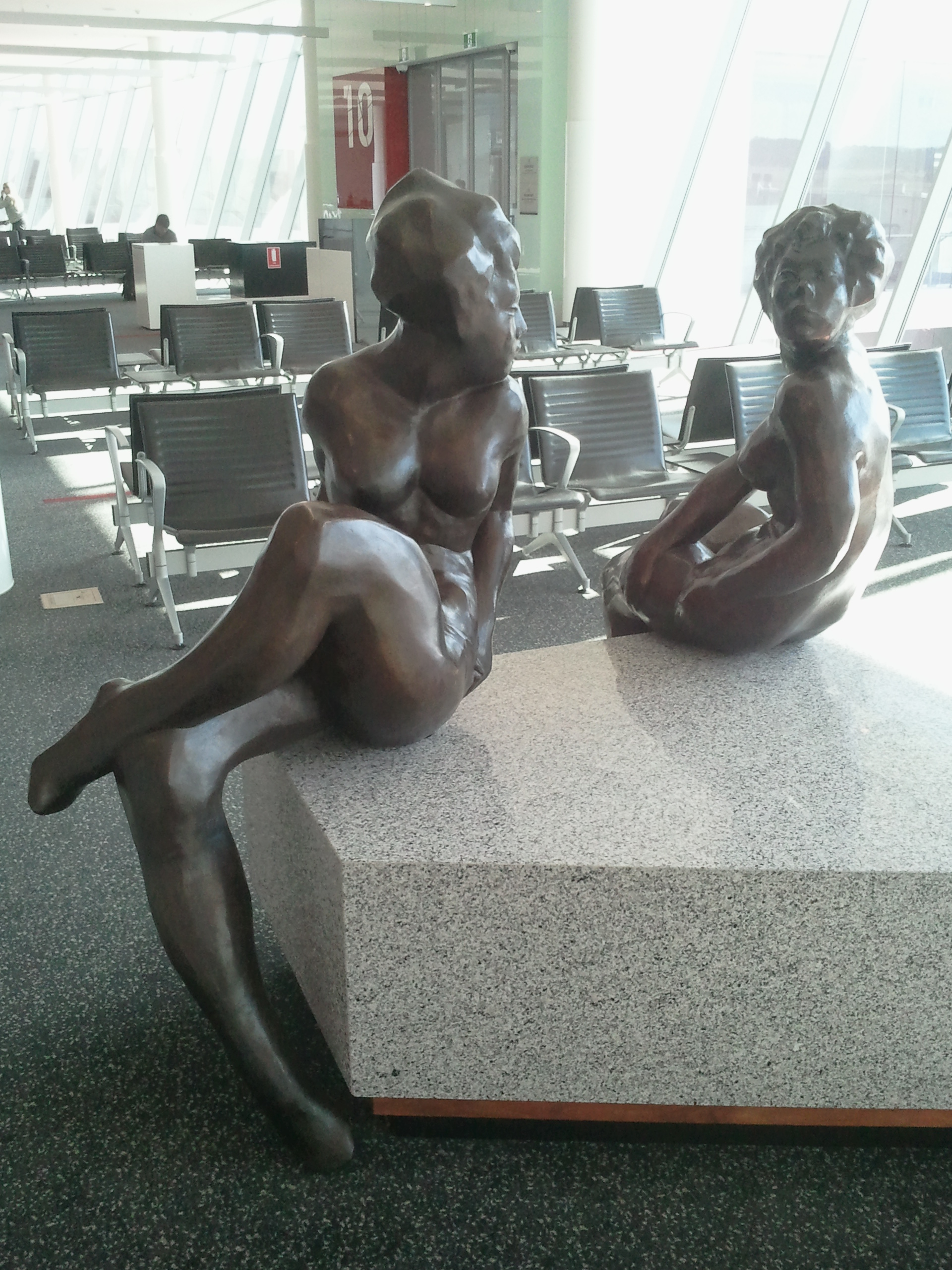
Bronze statues by Ante Dabro, Qantas gates, Canberra Airport

== Career ==
- 1964 - graduate, Academy of Fine Arts, Zagreb
- 1966 - Master of Arts, Academy of Fine Arts, Zagreb
- 1967 - emigrated to Australia, settled in Canberra
- 1971-2004 - teacher, School of Art, Australian National University
- 1984-6 - commission, Royal Australian Navy Memorial, Anzac Parade, Canberra
- 1989
  - commission, Liberal Party of Australia, miniature bust of Sir Robert Menzies
  - commission, Government of Australia, for French Bicentenary, sculpture of naval explorer Jean-François de Galaup, comte de La Pérouse (installed at the Promenade d'Australie in Paris)
- 1999 - Retrospective solo exhibition, 1969–99, Drill Hall Gallery, Canberra
- 2005 - commissions, for Terry Snow and Canberra Airport

== Staircase thefts ==
On the Staircase is a group of four stylised male figures, progressively smaller as they are further up a staircase of diminishing size, all in bronze. The figures are each reading a book. It cost $80,000. After it was again vandalised, in the local media it was attributed to Ante Dabro. Yet, it had been attributed correctly weeks earlier by another outlet to Danish artist, Keld Moseholm Dabro was quoted in local media, as being upset to the vandalism of art, perhaps adding to the confusion among the media. The smallest figure was removed on 8 December 2013, with the act visible on footage from a CCTV camera, with two women shown shortly before the theft. After the publicity, on the following day the figure was handed into a local ACT Police station.
