= Hellenic Memorial, Canberra =

Memorial sculpture on ANZAC Parade in Canberra, Australia

Coordinates: 35.2820°S 149.1466°E

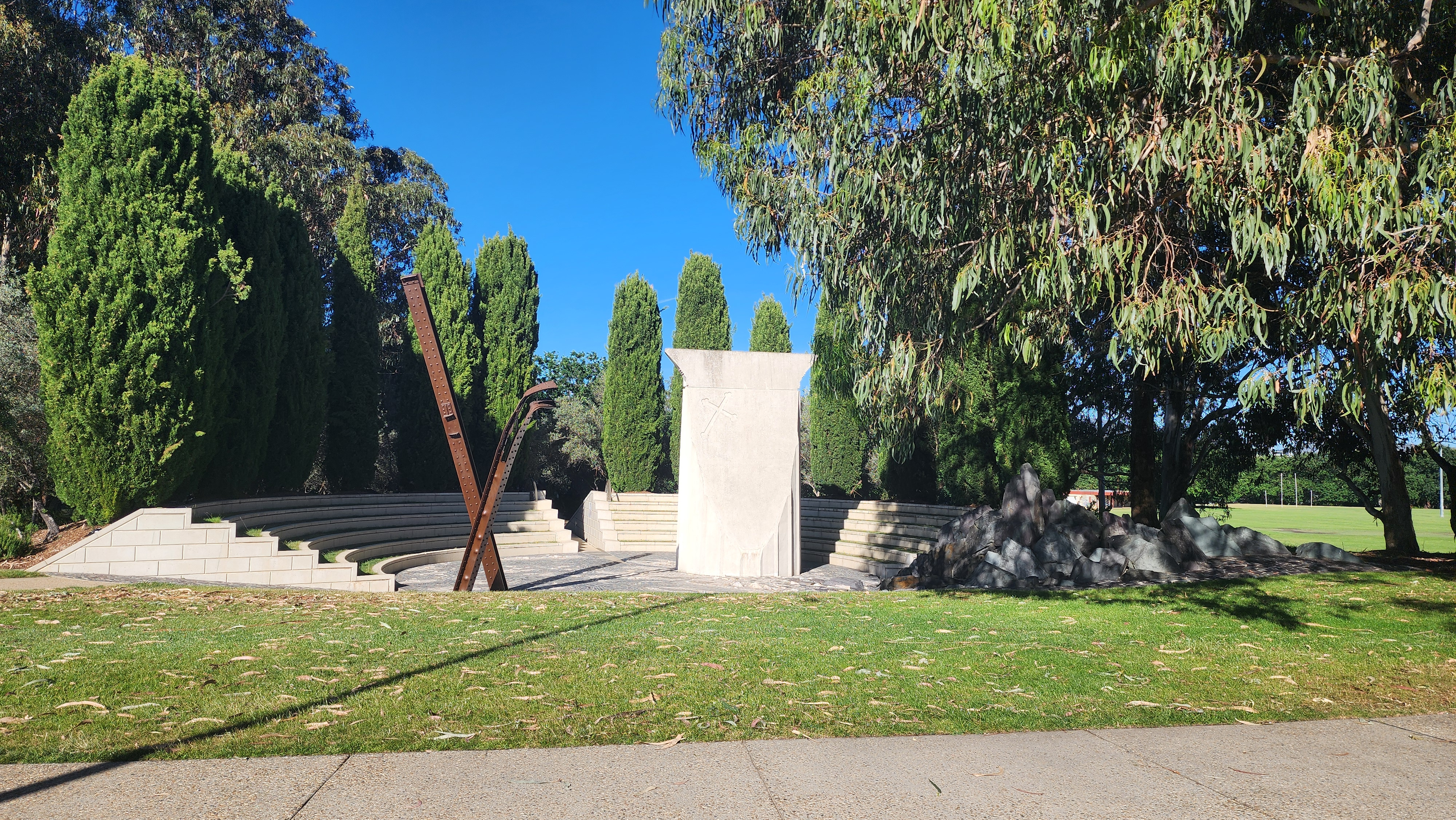

The Hellenic (Greek) Memorial is on Anzac Parade, beside the Australian War Memorial in Canberra, the national capital city of Australia.

On 6 April 1941, the 6th Division (Australian Army) joined Allied forces resisting German advancement in mainland Greece. The Allied troops, largely from Australia and New Zealand, were vastly outnumbered on the ground and German forces dominated in the air: This campaign became a 'fighting withdrawal'.

Many evacuated Australians were taken to Crete where, with British, New Zealand, and Greek troops, they fought the ill-fated Battle of Crete campaign against the German troops. More than 5,000 Australian troops became prisoners of war in both campaigns.

This memorial commemorates those who died and fought in these Greek campaigns, including in the Mediterranean Sea with the Royal Australian Navy and the Merchant Marine, members of the Royal Australian Air Force and the Nursing Services, Special Covert Forces, other Allied service personnel and Greek civilians who helped these people to safety.

The memorial was dedicated on 21 May 1988 by Bob Hawke, the Prime Minister of Australia, and Mr Ioannis Charalambopoulos, Deputy Prime Minister of Greece.

== Design ==
The marble memorial recalls the shape of an Ancient Greek theatre amidst an olive grove, backed by Cyprus pines. The doric column symbolises the birth of civilisation. The column is also embossed with the cross of the Greek Orthodox Church, representing a soldier's grave. The column stands on a mosaic pavement which represents the rugged coastline and battlefields of the campaigns amidst the peninsulas and islands of Greece. (Design: Mary Hall) The damaged steel fragments represent the futility and destruction of war and, together with the column, are indicative of buried relics of civilisation and conflict.

It was designed by architectural firm Ancher, Mortlock and Woolley Pty Ltd.

== Additional items ==
Behind the main memorial is a memorial tree planted on 28 April 1991 by the Deputy Prime Ministers of Greece and Australia, The Hon. Tzannis Tzannetakis and The Hon. Paul Keating, to mark the 50th anniversary of the battles of mainland Greece and Crete.

== Literature ==
- Ken Woolley, 1999: Ken Woolley and Ancher, Mortlock & Woolley: Selected and Current Works (The Master Architect Series IV), p. 148
