= Boer War Memorial, Canberra =

War memorial in Australia

Coordinates: 35.288344°S 149.141535°E

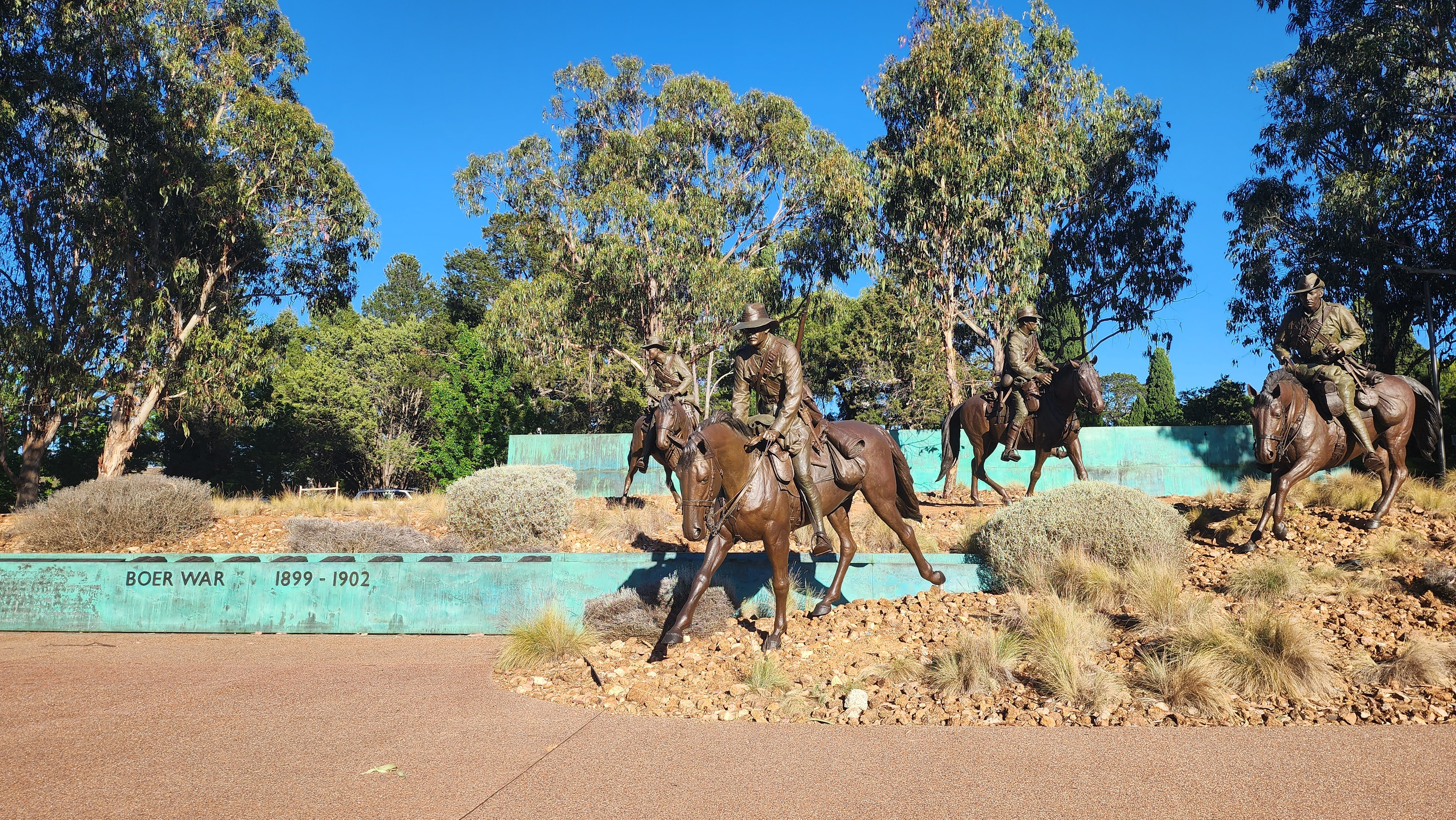

The Boer War Memorial in Canberra, Australian Capital Territory, is on Anzac Parade on the western row of memorials near Lake Burley Griffin. This commemorates the Military history of Australia during the Second Boer War, 1899-1902.

== Design ==
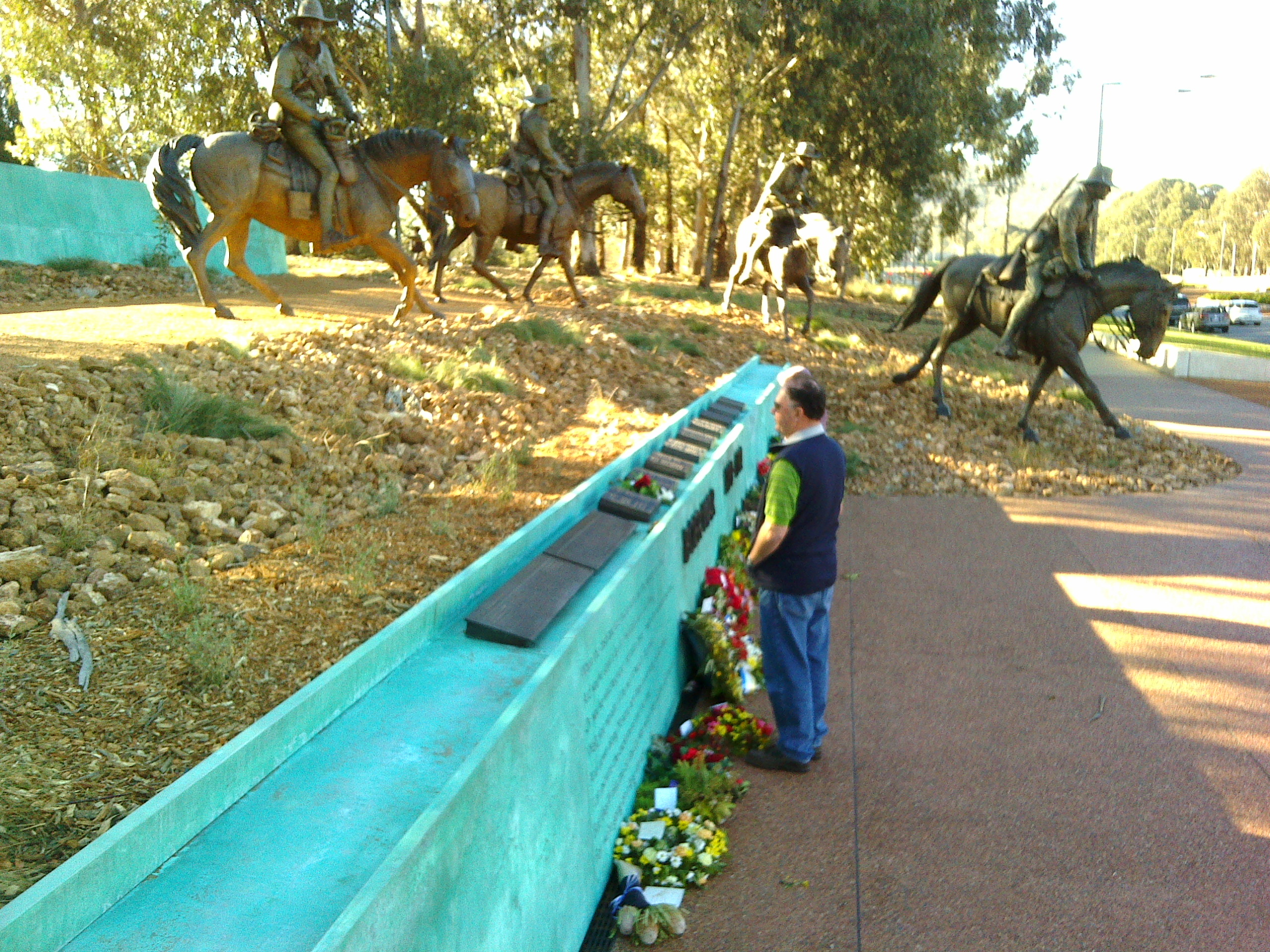
Overview

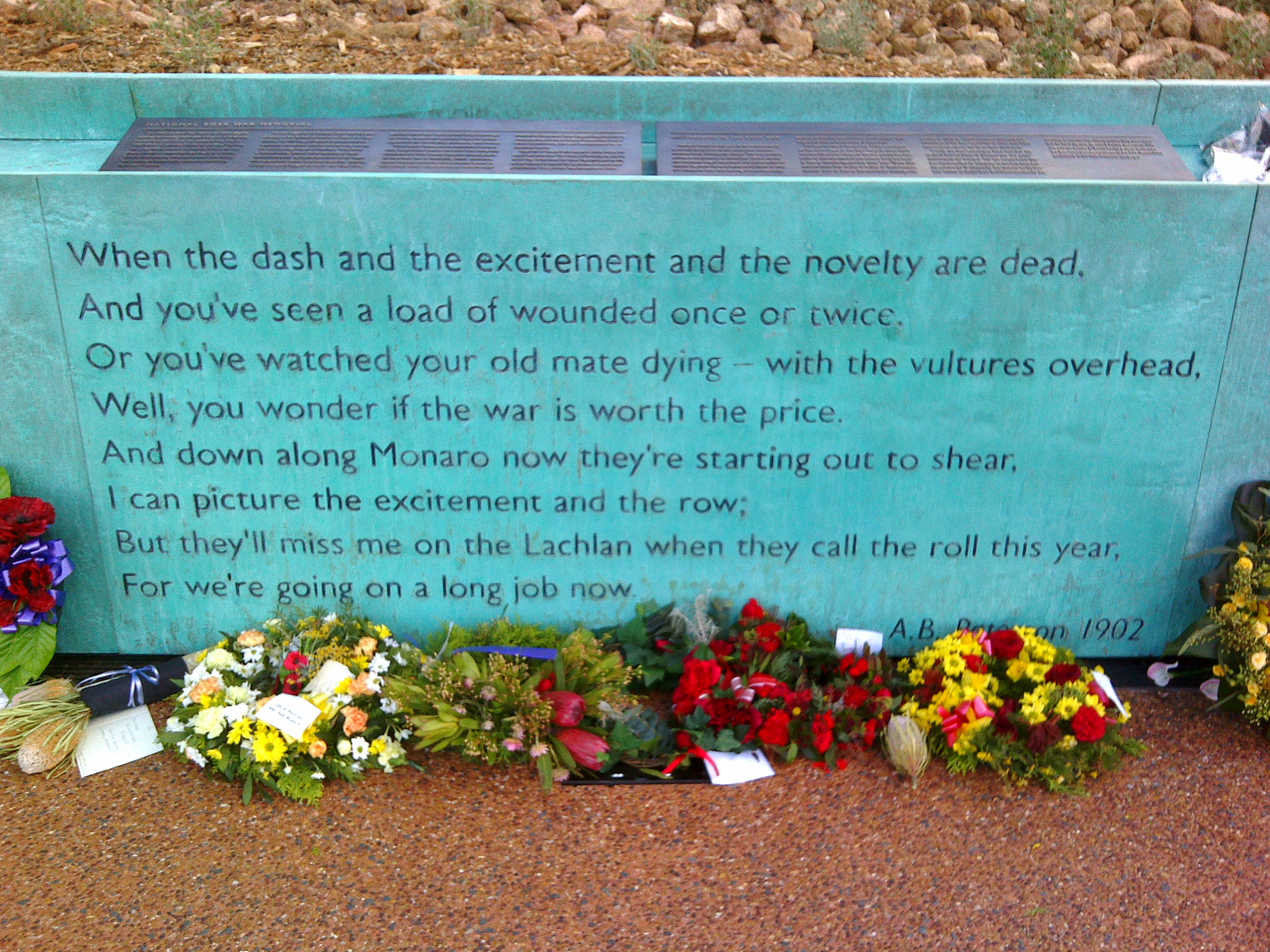
Paterson poetry

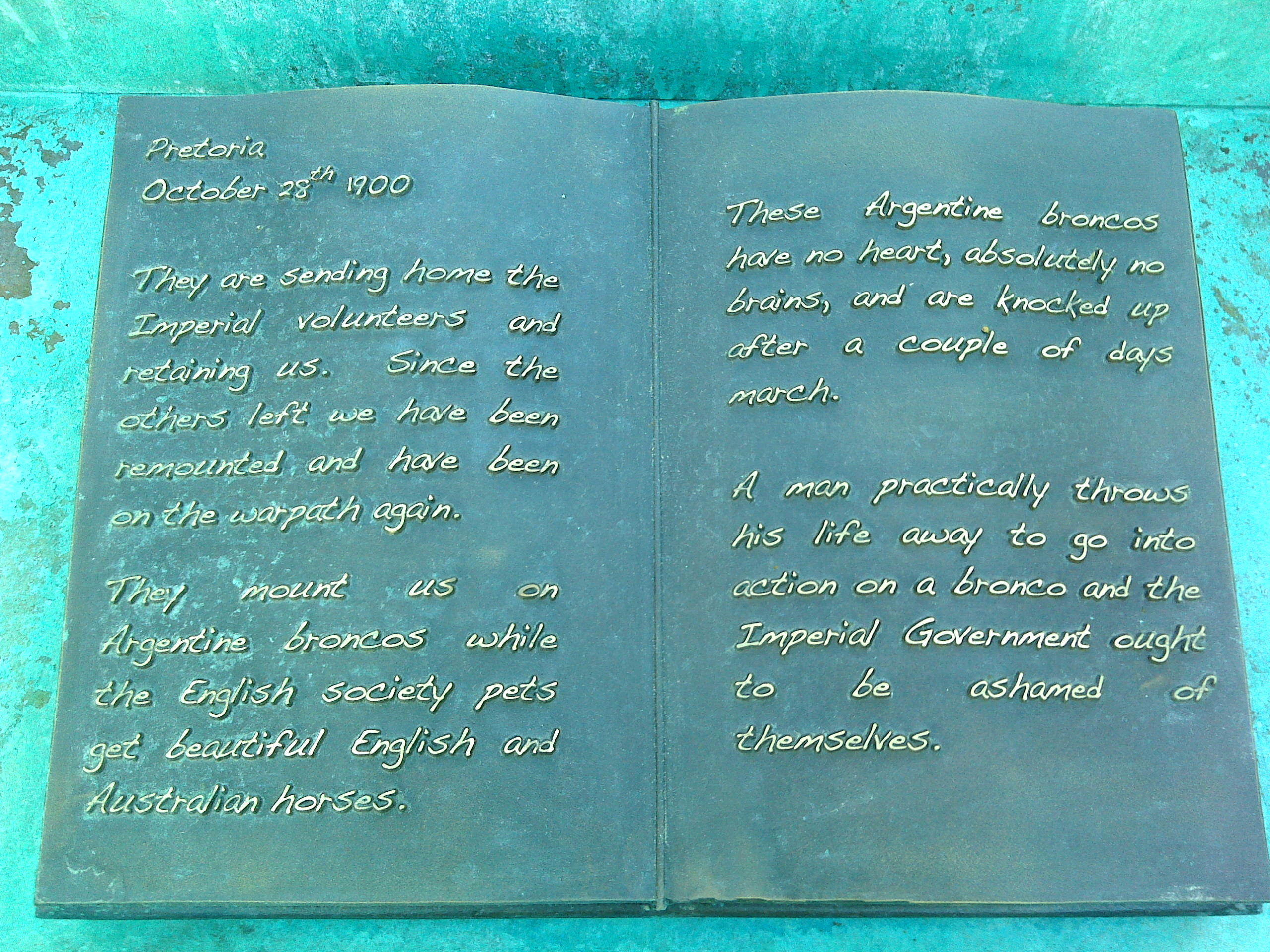
Soldier's letter on the memorial

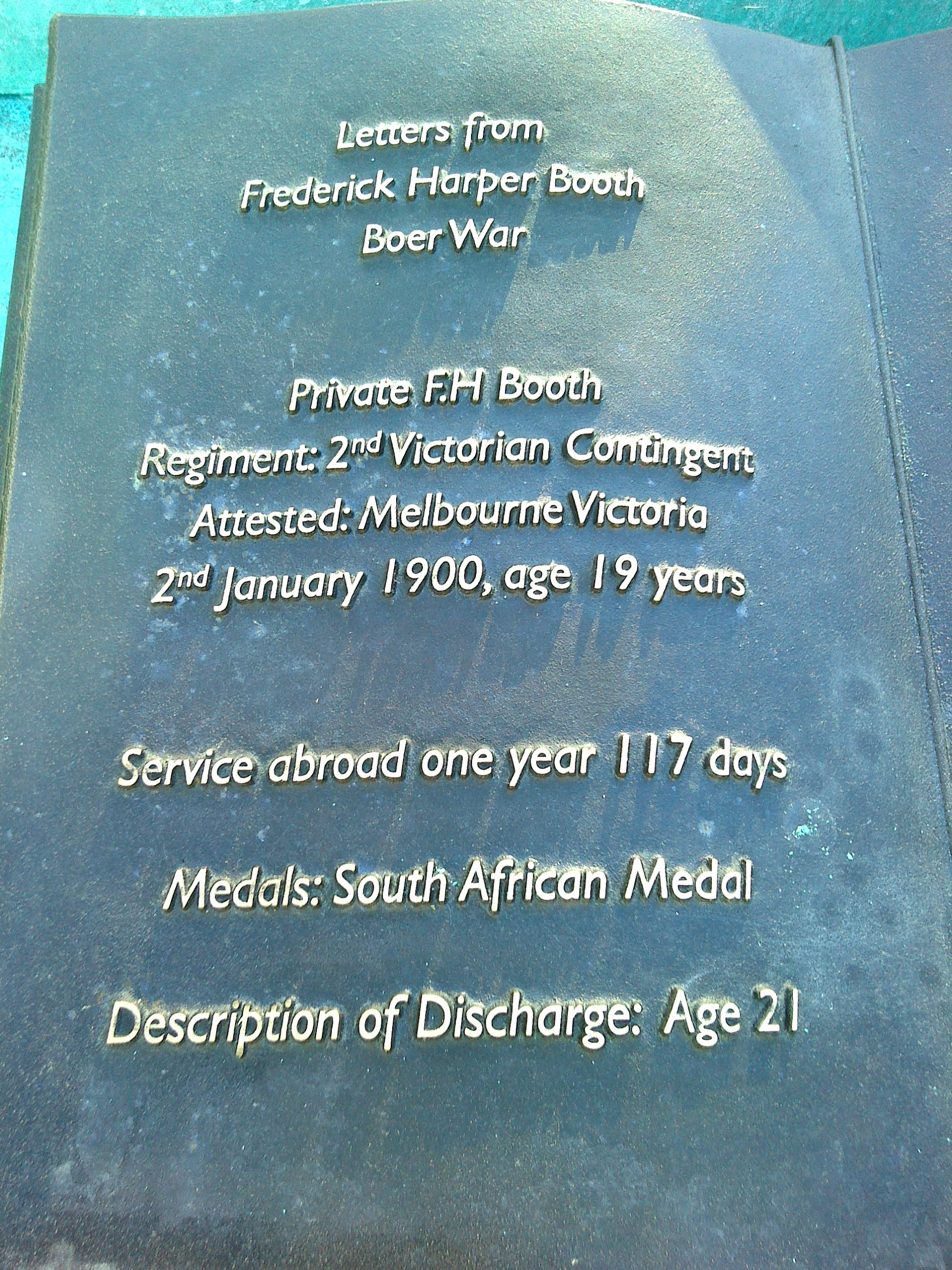
Explanation of the soldier whose letters adorn the memorial: Private Frederick Harper Booth, 2nd Victorian Contingent

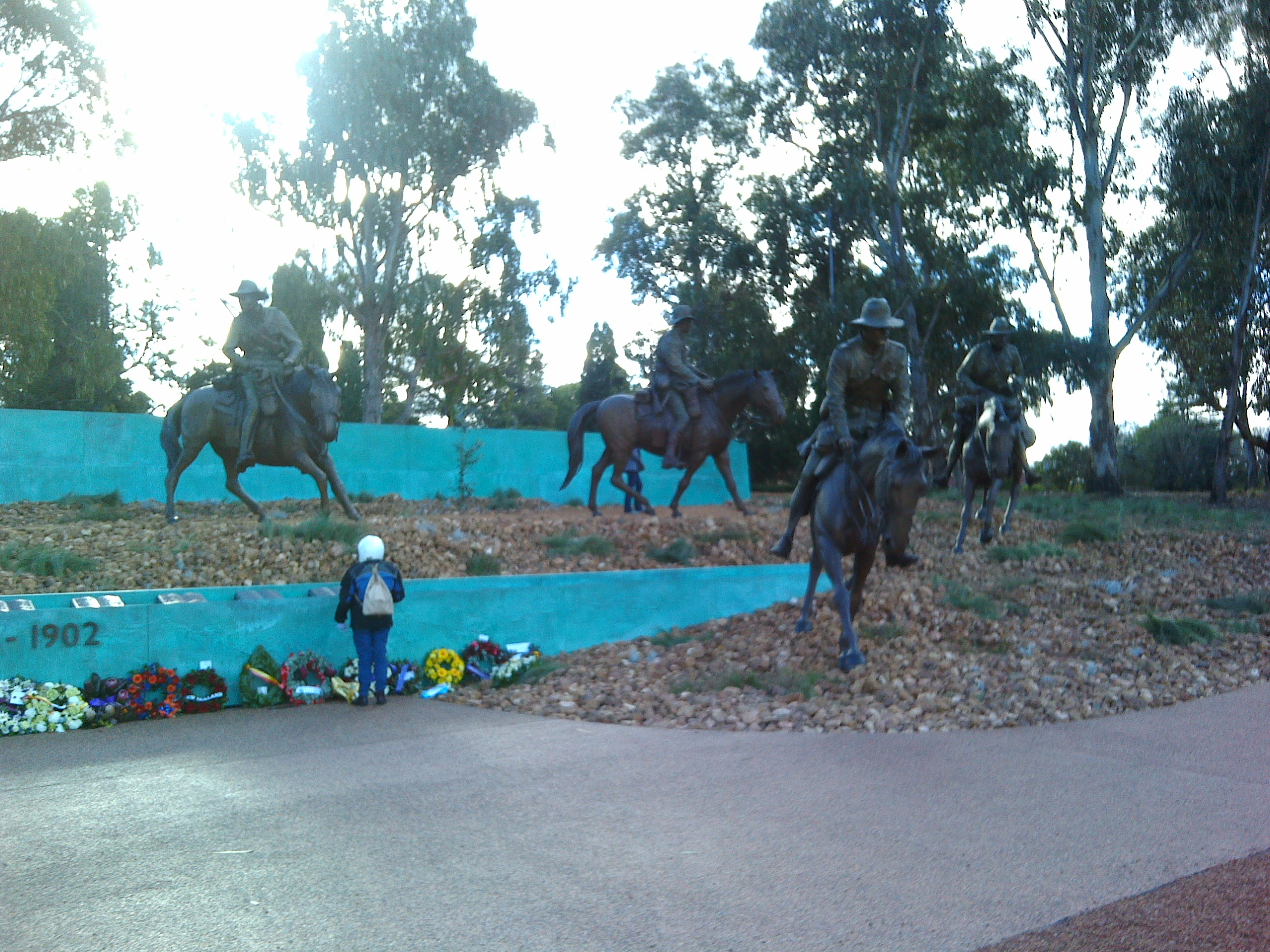
Four figures

Design was jointly by Pod Landscape Architecture and Jane Cavanough. The sculptor was Louis Laumen.

The design has four horsemen on their horses navigating through a stoney field with two blue-copper walls or plinths running one behind and one front-left of the horses. The walls were manufactured by Misura Design.

The Project Manager was Major Stephen Bain.

The four bronze statues use colouring techniques to give various hues to the figures, such as khaki for the soldier's clothes, tan for the horse's bodies, and black for the horse manes and tails. The bronzes were cast by Fundere Foundry, Melbourne, Australia.

On the front plinth is a piece of poetry about the Boer War, written by Australian poet Banjo Paterson in 1902, that mentions the Monaro region in which Canberra is sited.

When the dash and the excitement and the novelty are dead,
And you've seen a load of wounded once or twice,
Or you've watched your old mate dying, with the vultures overhead,
Well you wonder if the war is worth the price,
And down along the Monaro now they're starting out to shear,
I can picture the excitement and the row;
But they'll miss you on the Lachlan when they call the roll this year,
For we're going on a long job now.

On top of the front plinth are bronze plaques showing a soldier's words in his own hand, recalling various thoughts about being at the war.

The Glascott Landscape and Civil construction won the landscaping category at the Master Builders ACT Building Excellence Awards 2018.

== Dedication ==
The memorial was dedicated on 31 May 2017 by the Governor General of Australia, General Sir Peter Cosgrove AK MC.
