= National Emergency Services Memorial, Canberra =

Memorial in Canberra, Australia

Coordinates: 35°17′31.1″S 149°8′25.3″E

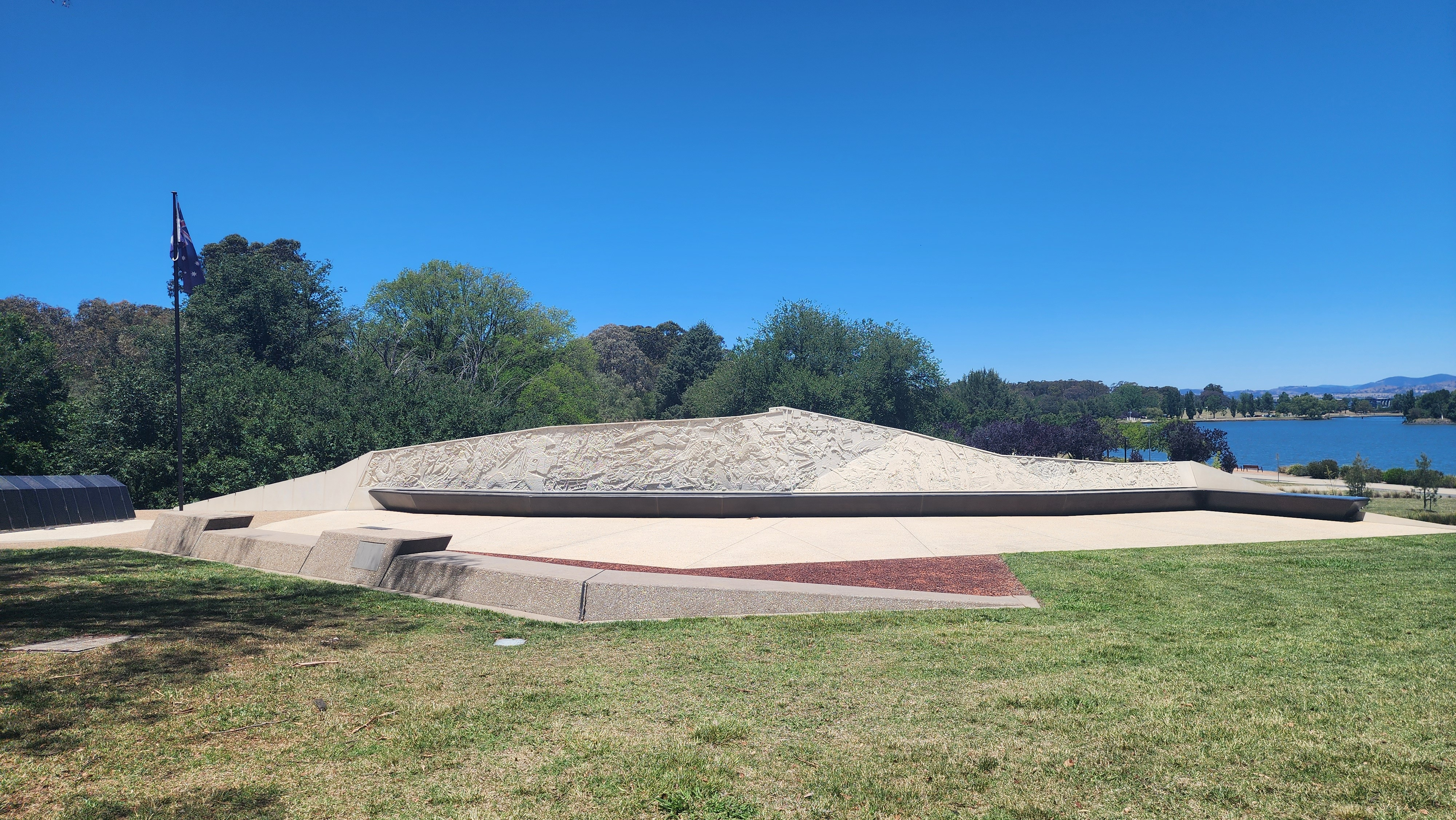

The National Emergency Services Memorial is a memorial located on the northern shore of Lake Burley Griffin at the southern end of Anzac Parade in Canberra, the national capital of Australia. It was dedicated in July 2004.

The overall memorial was designed by Aspect Melbourne Pty Ltd. The frieze bas relief was created by artist Charles Anderson. The outdoor sculpture was created by artist Darryl Cowie.

== Quote ==
"Honouring the thousands of men and women who serve and have served in Australia's emergency services. The memorial provides a place to reflect on those who have fallen or perished while carrying out their duties for the benefit of the wider Australian community.
Dedicated by The Hon. John Howard MP, Prime Minister of Australia, 12 July 2004".

== Gallery ==
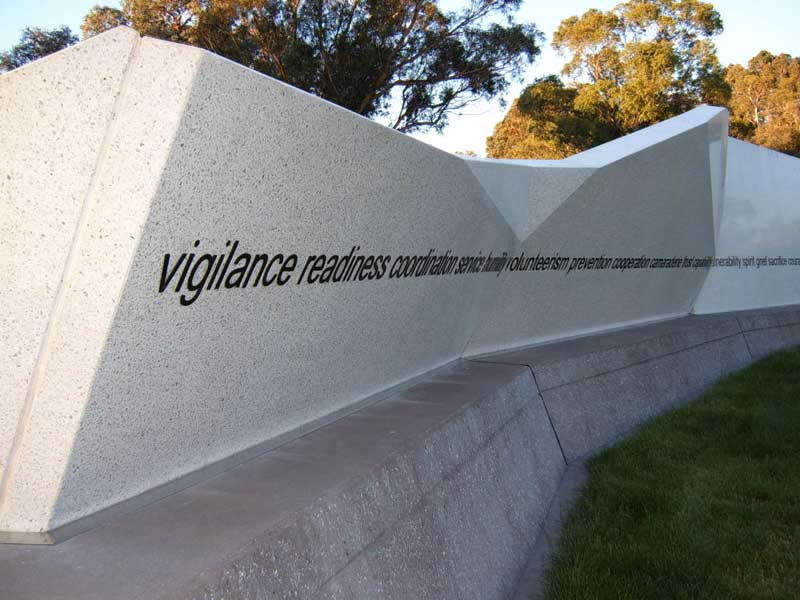
East face of memorial with inscription.

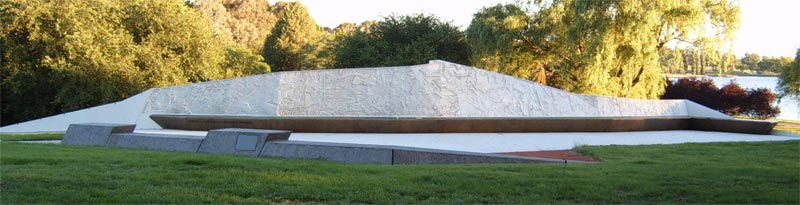
West face of the National Emergency Services Memorial.

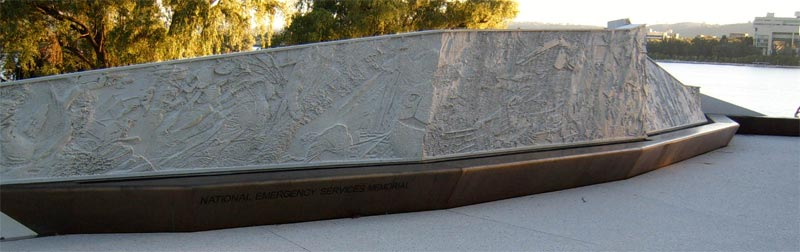
West face frieze bas relief, Lake Burley Griffin to right.

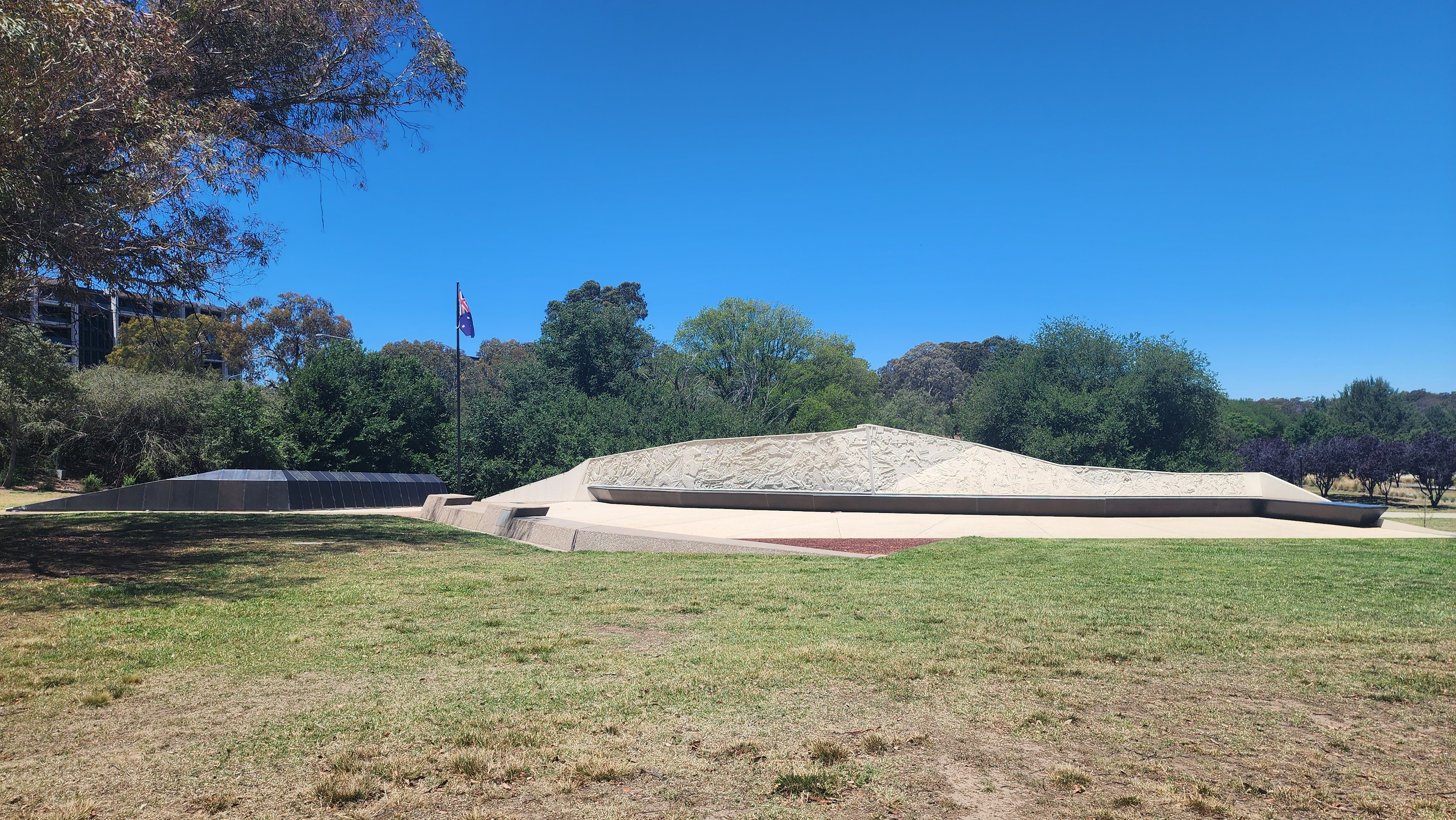
Overview with the wall on the left side

== See also ==
- Landmarks in Canberra
- Outdoor sculptures in Australia
