= Joan Walsh-Smith =

Australian sculptor (born 1946)

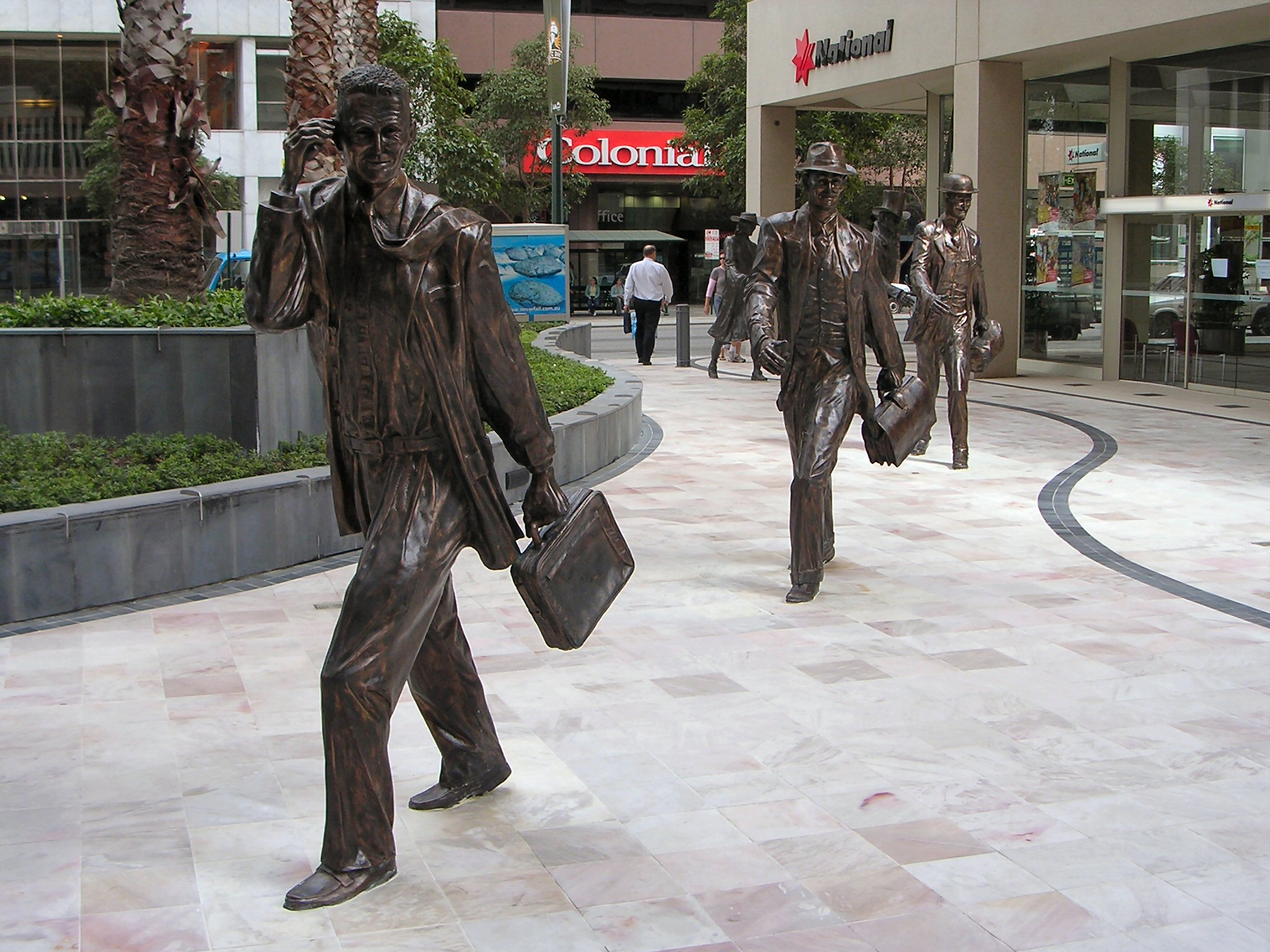
St Martin's Tower, Perth Western Australia. Sculptures by Joan Walsh-Smith, Charles Smith

Joan Walsh-Smith OAM (born 1946) is an Australian sculptor who works in a variety of mediums and materials. Walsh-Smith has worked on several large-scale memorials throughout Australia. Her most well-known work is the National Australian Army Memorial in Canberra.

== Early work ==
Joan was born in Ireland in 1946. She studied at the National College of Art and Design in Dublin, graduating in 1971. It was here that she met her husband and collaborative partner, Charles Smith. She was awarded her first public commission in 1972, for Gryphon, a 3m x 2m stone carving, located at the Northern Bank, Waterford, Ireland. In 1974 she won the Northern Ireland Arts Council's Art in Context: Public Sculpture Competition, with City People, a 30m bas-relief.

== Western Australia ==
In 1984, Joan immigrated to Western Australia, with her husband, Charlie Smith and their 3 children, Carl, Joanne and Raoul. With her husband she set up Smith Sculptors in Gidgegannup, Western Australia. Joan won her first major Australian commission in 1988, when Smith Sculptors was awarded the National Australian Army memorial project.

== Awards ==
The Smith Sculptors were awarded the Centenary Medal for Outstanding Achievement in the field of ‘Large Scale Public Art’ in 2001 and were finalists for WA Citizen of the Year in 2008. In 2012, they were both awarded Rotary International Paul Harris Fellowship Medals.

Walsh-Smith was awarded the Medal of the Order of Australia in the 2024 Australia Day Honours for "service to the visual arts as a sculptor".

== Memorial artworks ==
- HMAS Sydney II Memorial, Geraldton, WA
- Hugo Throssell VC 100th Anzac Memorial, Northam, WA
- National Australian Army Memorial, Canberra
- Pearl Diver Memorial, Broome, WA
- Indigenous Female Pearl Diver Memorial, Broome, WA
- Memorial to the Dying Elm
- Kobe Earthquake Memorial
- John Curtin Memorial
- Ocean Reef 100th ANZAC Memorial
- Dolphin Memorial
- Onslow War Memorial
- Onslow Memorial Cemetery Gates
- The Catalpa Memorial
- Memorial to the Migrant Children
- Memorial to HMAS Sydney, Denham WA
- Swansea RSL Rising Sun Anzac Memorial
- 100th ANZAC Dawn Across Australia
- Sydney Emden Friendship Mast
- Hugo Throssell VC 100th ANZAC Memorial
- The West Australian Irish Famine Memorial
- ANZAC Memorial, Upper Gascoyne WA
- Battle of Crete Memorial, King's Park, Perth
