= Australian Army Memorial, Canberra =

War memorial

Coordinates: 35.284°S 149.145°E

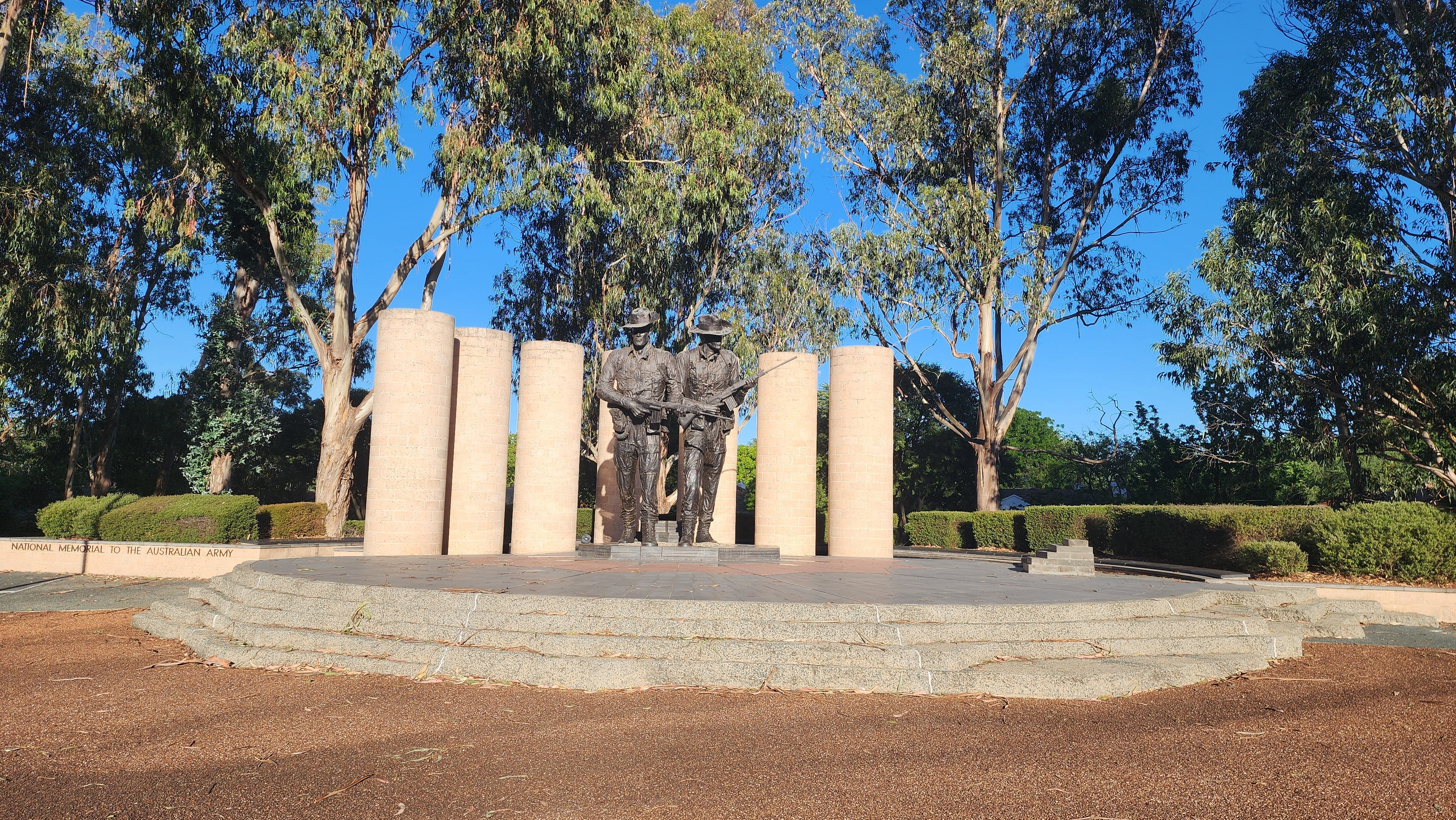
The pillars of the memorial

The Australian Army Memorial on Anzac Parade commemorates the service of Australian soldiers.

Australian soldiers have fought as a national group in conflicts since the Second Boer War in South Africa. This memorial commemorates their continuing tradition of service, in war, conflict and peace operations.

The memorial was unveiled by the Governor-General of Australia, The Hon. Bill Hayden AC on 1 November 1989. Presented on behalf of the people of Australia: Prime Minister of Australia, Bob Hawke AC.

== Design ==
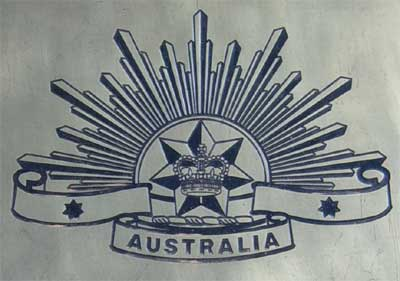
Army 'Rising Sun' badge

The two central figures represent two Australian soldiers facing the east and the rising sun, and represent the importance of support and comradeship represented in the Australian term, 'mates'. They wear the distinctive Australian slouch hat that carries the 'Rising Sun' badge. The figures stand on a raised podium paved in a radial pattern which refers to the Army insignia. Seven pillars represent the seven major conflicts in which the Australian Army was involved during the 20th century. They are surrounded by water, symbolic of the long sea journeys involved in Australian campaigns.

This memorial is also intended to remind the visitor of the importance of the Australian Digger in the development of national character and sentiment. The term 'Digger' was first used to describe the Australian soldiers during the trench warfare of World War I.

The main design was by sculptors Joan Walsh-Smith and Charles Smith in collaboration with architects Ken Maher and Partners. The bronze casting was assisted by the Army's Royal Australian Electrical and Mechanical Engineers (RAEME).
