= Royal Australian Navy Memorial =

Memorial in Canberra honouring sailors

Coordinates: 35.284°S 149.146°E

The Royal Australian Navy Memorial on Anzac Parade in Canberra, the national capital of Australia, honours the sailors who have served to protect the nation.

On 10 July 1911, the Commonwealth Naval Forces were renamed the Royal Australian Navy. The RAN has served, in all oceans, in conflict and peace, since then.

The memorial was unveiled by Queen Elizabeth II on 3 March 1986, on the occasion of the 75th anniversary of the formation of the RAN.

== Design ==
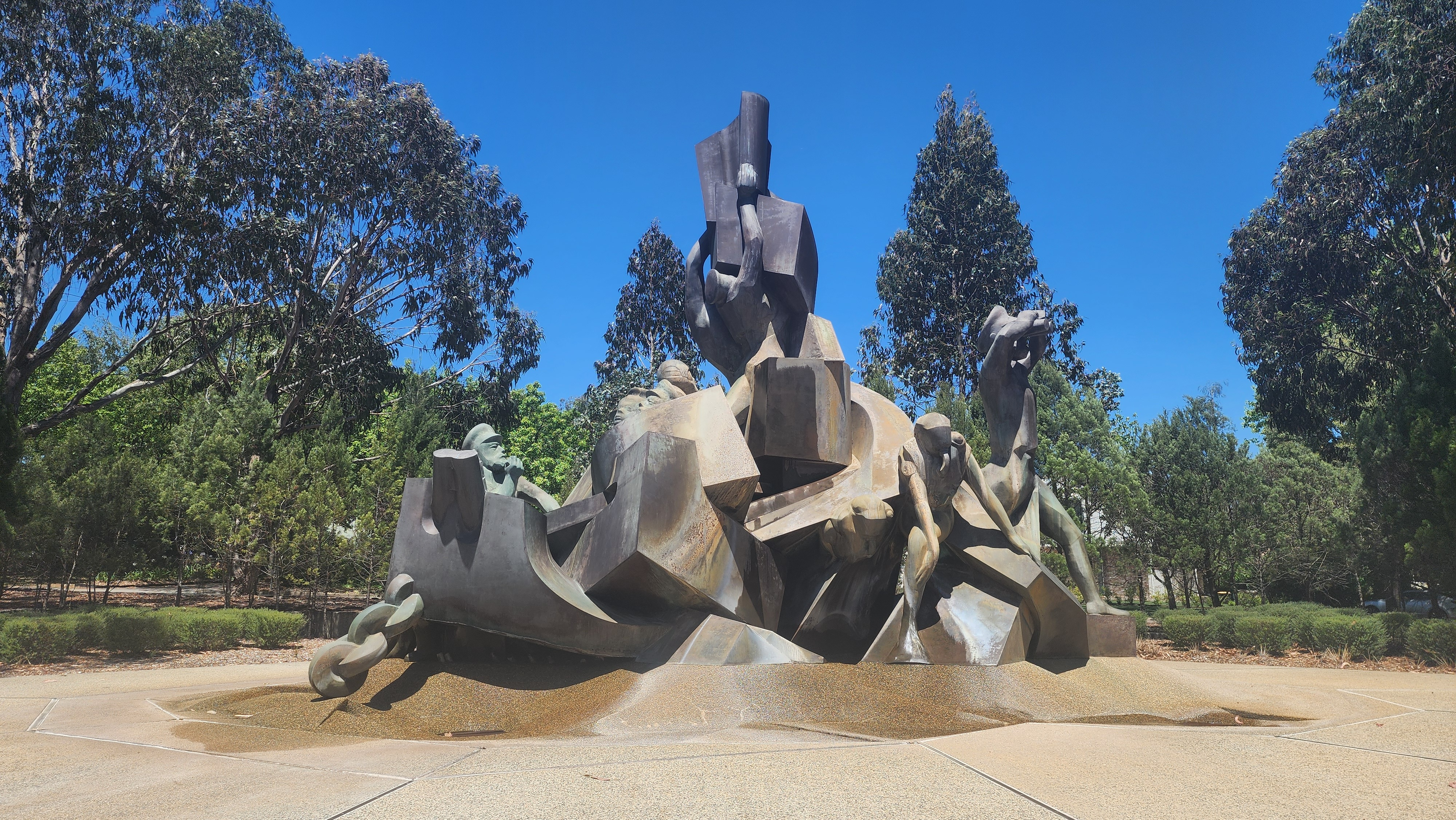

Bronze figures feature in the memorial and show the daily activities of naval life; the geometric forms, such as the anchor chain, depict elements of a ship. The torrents of water complement the dynamic forms of the work. (The memorials along Anzac Parade were specifically exempted from water restrictions during the drought of 2005.)

The memorial is also known as Sailors and Ships – Interaction and Interdependence, and was designed and executed by Ante Dabro in collaboration with Lester Firth and Associates, and Robert Woodward.
