= Australian Peacekeeping Memorial =

Memorial sculpture in Canberra, Australia

- Australia
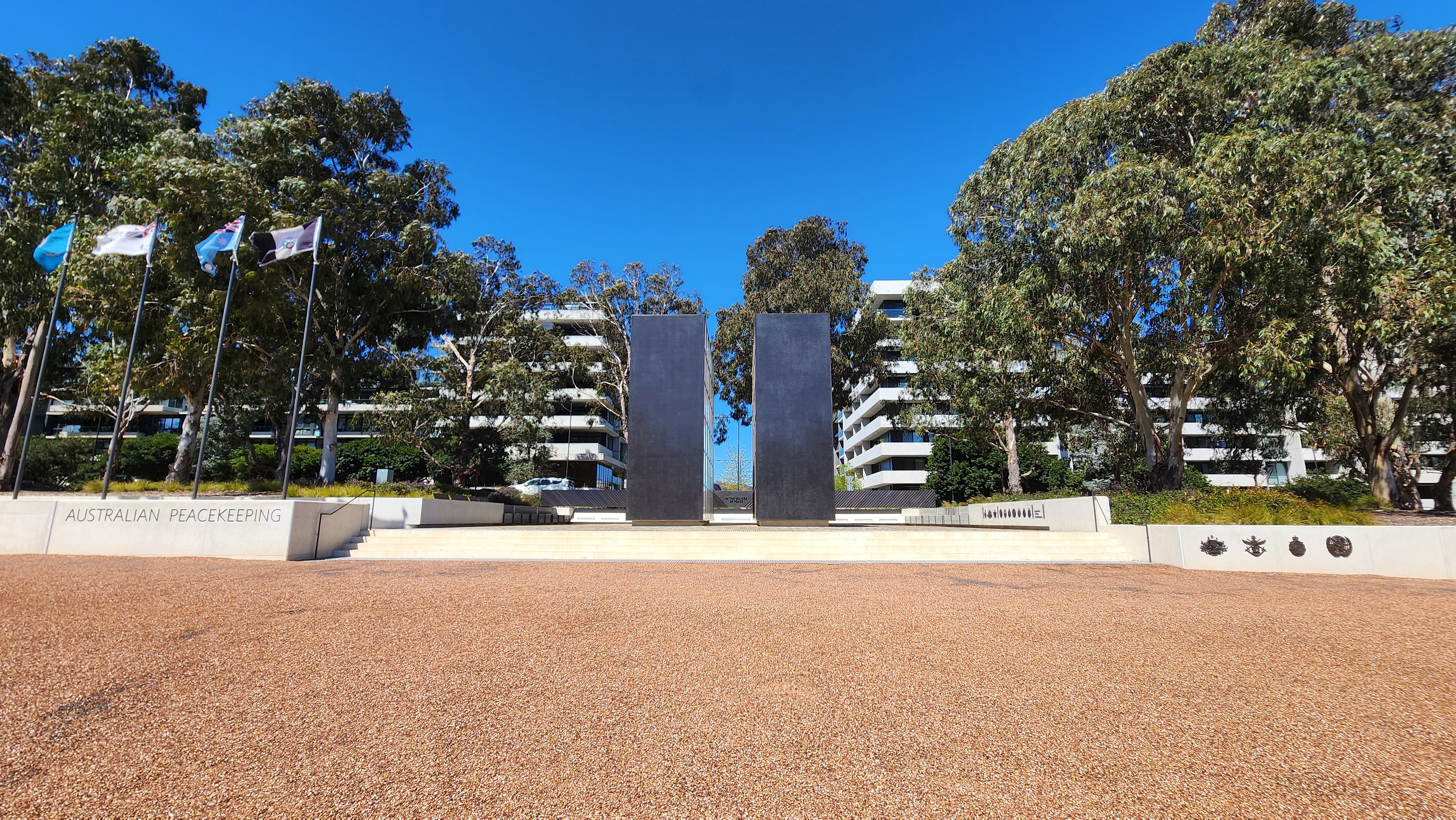
- The Australian Peacekeeping Memorial
- For Australian peacekeepers
- Established: 14 September 2017; 8 years ago
- Location: 35°17′20″S 149°08′32″E
- Designed by: Super Colossal (later Bennett & Trimble)

The Australian Peacekeeping Memorial, located at the southern end of Anzac Parade in Canberra, Australian Capital Territory, commemorates the service and sacrifice of all Australians who have served on peacekeeping or peacemaking missions around the world. It was inaugurated on 14 September 2017 by the Governor-General of Australia, General Sir Peter Cosgrove AK MC. The Memorial is a living memorial that commemorates the service of all Australian peacekeepers- past, present and into the future.

== Description of Memorial ==
The Memorial has three main elements which together physically represent the roles of Australian Peacekeepers – military, police and civilians - in the service of international peace and security.

The first element is the two black polished masonry Monoliths symbolizing the "opposing forces of conflict" while the passageway of golden light between them created by the backlit onyx stone represents the "light of hope for the future" through peace and security brought about by peacekeepers.

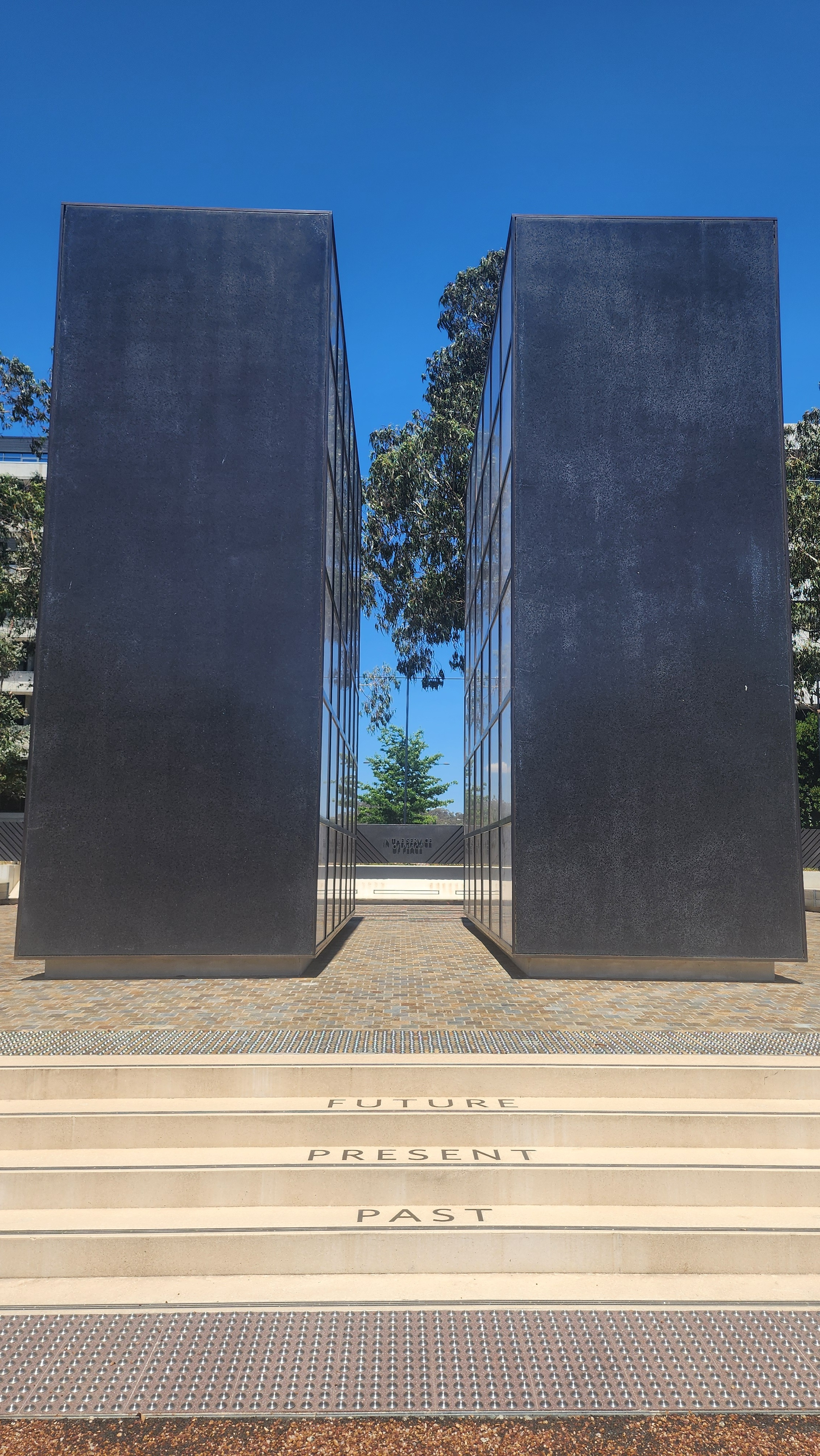
The steps and passage between monoliths

Through the passageway of light is the second element, the cobblestone Courtyard, a peaceful gathering space for personal reflection and ceremonial purposes. On the courtyard surface are bronze plaques inscribed with words describing the personal traits of Australian Peacekeepers progressing to the values, actions, activities and finally the objectives of international peacekeeping as the plaques advance across the courtyard in parallel with the path of travel from front to rear.

At the rear, the peaceful ambiance of the courtyard is contained by the third element, a single massive black polished masonry Commemorative Beam denoting the strength and stability that results from peacekeeping activities. Bronze facings on the beam are inscribed with the United Nations and other international peacekeeping missions and campaigns in which Australian Peacekeepers have participated. Below the beam is a white concrete inclined plane surface with bronze fixings for placing commemorative wreaths or remembrance flowers.

Crests displayed at the front of the Memorial are those of organisations under whose auspices Australian Peacekeepers have operated and at the side, organisations from which they have been drawn.

== Background ==
Since 14 September 1947, when four Australian military observers began their mission in Indonesia to help monitor the ceasefire between The Netherlands and the independence forces of the fledgling state of Indonesia, there have been Australian military, police and civilians involved in peacekeeping missions somewhere around the world. Over 60,000 Australians have served in peacekeeping missions, some have been killed or died whilst overseas and many have been injured or traumatised by their experiences, and through them, their families have been adversely affected.

The large number of the Australians returning from service with the International Force for East Timor (INTERFET) and the United Nations Transitional Administration in East Timor (UNTAET) prompted a number of people in the Australian Defence Force, the Australian Federal Police and the Australian Peacekeepers and Peacemaker Veterans Association to discuss and propose that a national memorial to peacekeepers be erected. The idea was supported by the then Chief of Army, soon to become Chief of Defence Force in 2002, General Peter Cosgrove, and the relevant federal government Ministers and Opposition spokespersons of the day.

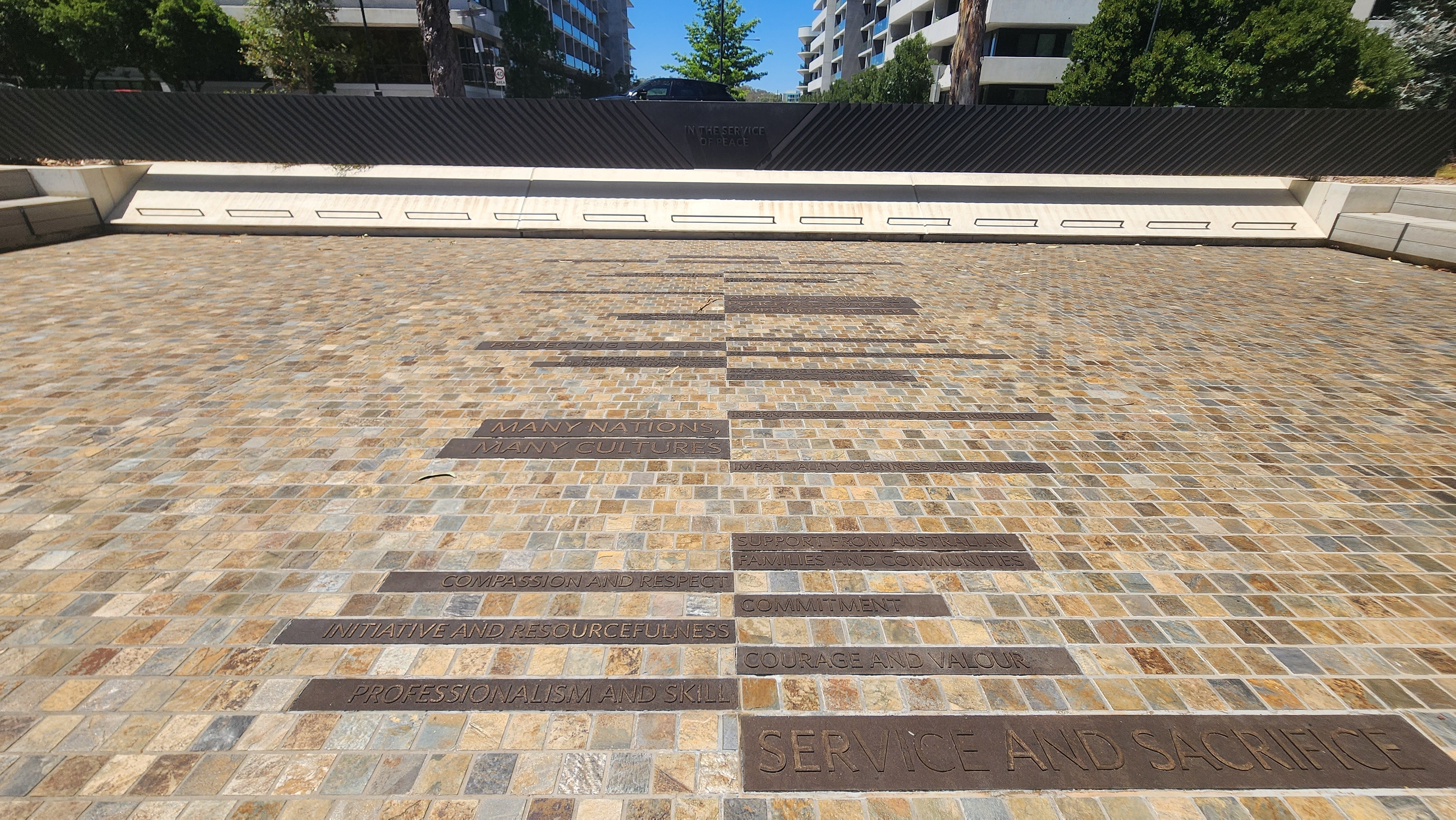
At the rear is a courtyard with words describing peacekeeping, and an area for floral and other tributes.

Other veterans' associations within Australia soon joined the call to address the fact that there was no national memorial to provide a focus for remembrance and commemoration of peacekeepers. A few plaques were dotted around the country, but there were no individual memorials or a national memorial - such as the Peacekeeping Monument in Ottawa, the only one of its kind in the world at the time. Since then, a memorial to commemorate all peacekeepers would have died serving on UN peacekeeping missions has been erected on the North Lawn of the UN headquarters in New York.

== Formation of a project to build a national memorial ==
In 2005 a committee was established, with representatives from the various veterans' associations of Australia, the Australian Defence Force, and the Australian Federal Police (representing both Federal and state police services – state police officers serving on peacekeeping missions were and are transferred to the Australian Federal Police for the duration of the officer's deployment). The committee created the Australian Peacekeeping Memorial Project, a formal not-for-profit organisation with limited liability, with the simple objective to erect a national peacekeeping memorial on Anzac Parade in Canberra.

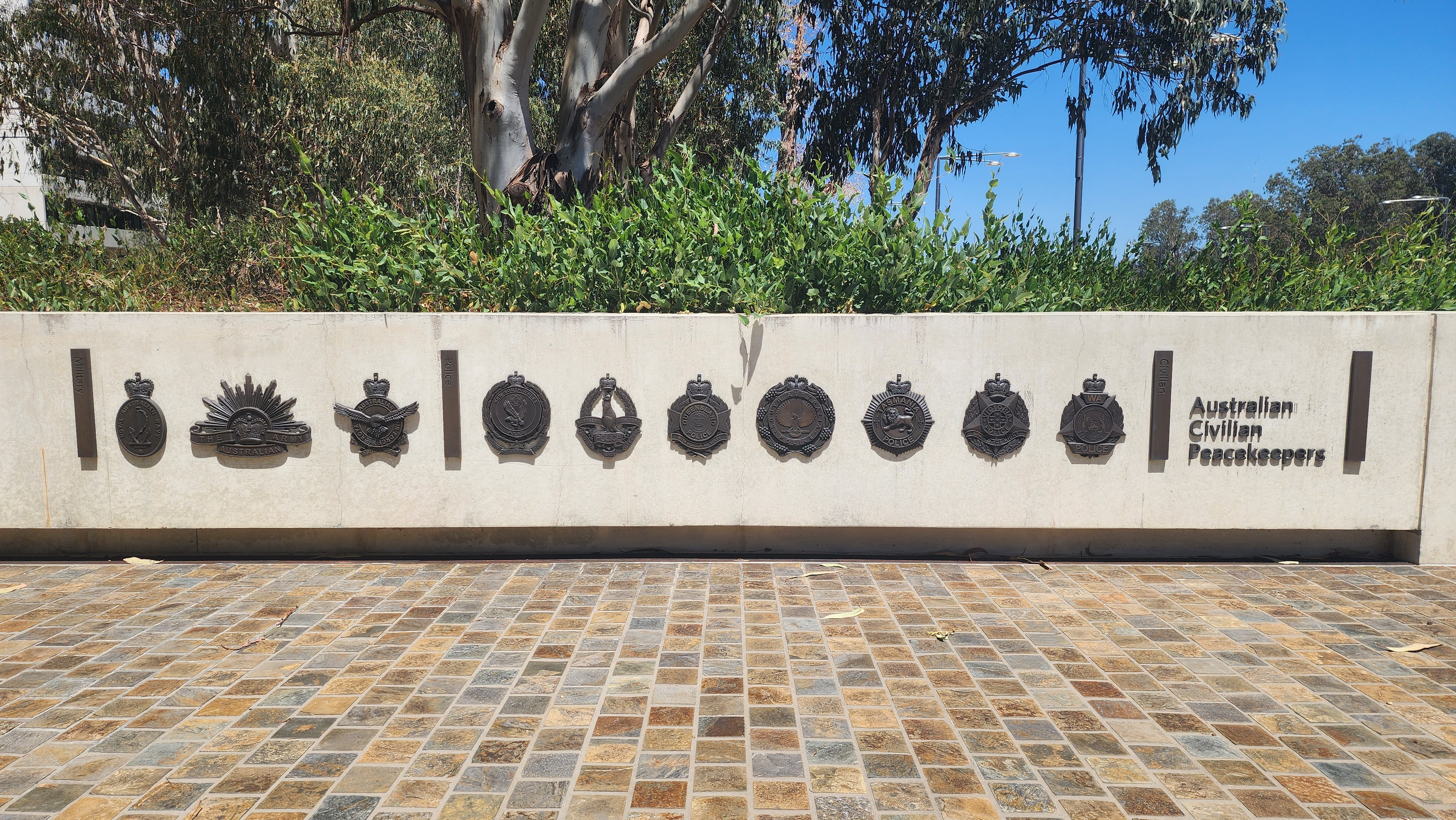
To the right on the plinth are logos representing the armed and civil (police) services who have been part of the peacekeeping forces deployed by Australia. To the left are plaques in English and Braille outline the purpose, symbolism, major donors, memorial contractors and the dedication of the memorial.

The veterans' associations represented on the committee were: The Returned and Services League of Australia (RSL), the United Nations Association of Australia (UNAA), the Australian Peacekeeper and Peacemaker Veterans Association (APPVA) and the United Nations and Overseas Policing Association of Australia (UNOPAA) – although at the time of the formation of the committee the UNOPAA was called the United Nations Policing Association of Australia.

The committee elected Major General Tim Ford AO (retired) as its chairperson, who remained in the position throughout the life of the project and committee. Major General Ford not only had a distinguished career in the Australian Army but served as the Head of Mission for the United Nations Truce Supervision Organisation (UNTSO) in the years 1998–2000 before being appointed as Military Adviser to the Under Secretary General for Peacekeeping at UN Headquarters in New York, a post he held until September 2002.

The committee also included a number of other people who had skills that would prove useful in achieving the aims of the project, including Mr Warren Lewis a civil engineer with long experience in project development in the construction industry in Australia. He became the committee's project development manager, leading the development of contractual documentation, supervising the selected architect and builder and acting as prime interlocutor with the National Capital Authority.

The committee was also aided by a number of Australian companies who provided pro bono support rather than direct financial donation.

The APMP was granted Donor Gift Recipient (charity) status by the federal government on several occasions (not continuously), allowing all donations above $2 to be claimed as a tax deduction by the donor.

== Design Competition ==
In 2008 a competition was conducted, under the guidance of the NCA, to find a design for the memorial. The competition was open to any architectural practices operating within Australia, and the design brief was simple – the memorial had to reflect Australia's involvement in peacekeeping, be architecturally notable and cost less than a defined ceiling value of $3M. In the first stage of the competition, fourteen submissions were received, from which four were selected as meriting further development. The four practices involved were asked to develop their designs to a level that would allow a competition jury, established by the APMP committee, to better assess their final appearance and to provide reasonable estimates for the cost of construction.

On 19 December 2008, the winner of the Australian Peacekeeping Memorial Design Competition was announced at Parliament House. The winner of the competition was Super Colossal, now Bennett and Trimble, an architectural practice based in Sydney.

The APMP Committee was impressed by the visual simplicity of the design; its visual impact on its surroundings; its representation of the work of peacekeepers; its reflection of the Australian landscape and its relatively low cost.

== Design Development Program ==
The design program, led by the architect with input from several Australian engineering consultants, commenced in January 2009 and progressed through the various stages of design development to the completion of "detailed design and documentation". A quantity surveyor was appointed by the APMP committee to produce a cost plan which was progressively updated throughout the design process. The completed "design package" was approved by the APMP committee in November 2009 and endorsed by the NCA in December after some changes were made to provide better access within the memorial to accommodate future NCA maintenance equipment.

== Construction Competition ==
The APMP committee made the decision to limit the selection of a construction contractor to those which were well established within the Australian Capital Territory and its environs. The committee established a selection panel from within its membership, augmented by an independent architect providing pro bono support.

During 2010 the selection panel conducted extensive interviews with four construction companies based in the Australian Capital Territory and all four were invited to submit proposals for the construction of the memorial in accordance with the "design package". Having assessed these proposals in detail, in November 2010 the panel selected Manteena Pty Ltd to develop a test prototype and to construct the Memorial itself. A contract was signed in January 2011.

Manteena had already constructed several national memorials in Canberra, completed public landscaping projects and civil engineering works that involved an artistic element, and were very familiar with the Anzac Parade memorial environment.

== The Construction ==
The time of selecting Manteena to build the memorial there had been insufficient funds raised to begin full construction. Nevertheless, sufficient funds were available to conduct a prototype program (or risk reduction program, which had been incorporated into the contract) to assess materials suitability, construction techniques and general functionality required to achieve the desired Memorial aesthetic as well as to identify and resolve any unforeseen construction problems that might occur during actual construction. The work included the construction of a full-scale section of a monolith and façade with backlighting; examples of bronze lettering for courtyard plaques and front steps; a section of the Commemorative beam; specialized formwork; and examples of cobblestone sets for the courtyard. This risk reduction program proved well worth the relatively small expense, and the detailed design drawings were duly modified and a revised cost plan produced by the quantity surveyor.

On successful completion of the prototype program in September 2011, sufficient funds remained to procure long lead-time materials required for the construction. Those materials were the golden onyx stone panels of the backlit facade of each black monolith forming the "golden" passageway between the monoliths, and the stone to be used as cobblestone pavers on the surface of the courtyard. Golden onyx is not indigenous to Australia, and so had to be sourced from overseas. Eventually suitable onyx was sourced from a Mexican quarry which was shipped to Italy for final cutting and polishing of the stone panels and for toughened glass to be bonded to the face of each panel. The glass strengthens the stone panels and provides protection from both the weather and vandalism. The courtyard pavers were sourced from a quarry in Kanmantoo in South Australia after a nationwide search for suitable stone. Both the onyx/glass panels and courtyard pavers arrived in Canberra by August 2014.

In September 2015, the federal government, through the Department of Defence, provided a major grant to the project which, whilst insufficient to complete the memorial, allowed the project team to modify the construction plan into a two-stage approach and begin work on the first stage. The first stage was the courtyard, lighting and the Commemorative Beam. In effect, this was all work except the construction of the two monoliths and the various bronze plaques and insignia. This change in approach necessitated modifying the construction drawings and program to accommodate a potentially extensive hiatus between the two stages and necessitated seeking revised approval from the NCA in February 2016. After some delay associated with the revised works approval, a new two-stage contract was prepared and signed with Manteena and work finally began on constructing the memorial in June 2016. Fund raising efforts were stepped up using the fact the memorial construction was underway as a "selling point".

In February 2017, with stage 1 construction due for completion in May, the federal government decided to provide a further grant to cover the cost of the second stage of construction. This decision meant reverting to the original single stage design and further re-arranging the construction program with its attendant disruptions to sequencing of trades and supplies, etc.. Despite the disruption to the development plan, Manteena and its subcontractors were able to achieve "substantial completion" of the Memorial to enable dedication by the Governor General on the 70th Anniversary of Australian Peacekeeping on 14 September 2017.

== Project Funding ==
After an initial burst of generosity by both Australian industry and the federal government, fundraising became very slow. The 2008 financial crisis had a severe effect on the committee's ability to obtain donations. It had been hoped that the majority of the funds needed to complete the project would be provided by Australian industry, and defence industry in particular, however such support did not eventuate. The Australian community, like others around the world, felt the GFC for many years. Personal and commercial philanthropy focused on social and individual support programs rather than other endeavours such as the memorial. Nevertheless, there were some major donors to the Memorial, whose names are shown on a donor plaque at the site.

The federal government eventually made three grants to the APMP; the first in 2006 as seed funding to get the project underway, the second in late 2015 which allowed construction work to begin (the first stage of a two staged approach), and a third in early 2017 which provided the remaining funds needed to complete the memorial. In total, the federal government provided 75% of the project's costs, Australian industry and veteran organisations 20% and individuals 5%.

The total project cost was $4.1m (2018). Escalation over 12 years of inflation was kept to the barest minimum through cost reviews and detailed re-design effort to find more economical methods of construction or materials. Less than 3% of the funds raised were expended on project administration, fundraising and publicity.

== Dedication Ceremony ==
The Australian Peacekeeping Memorial was dedicated by the Governor-General, His Excellency General Sir Peter Cosgrove AK MC, on 14 September 2017. The Governor-General's wife, Lady Lyn Cosgrove represented the families and friends of all Australian peacekeepers.

The Minister for Veterans' Affairs, the Hon Dan Tehan MP; and the project's Patron-in-Chief, His Excellency General David Hurley AC, Governor of New South Wales, were guests of honour.

14 September is Peacekeeping Day in Australia, reflecting the day on which Australia's, and the United Nations', first peacekeepers deployed in Indonesia in 1947. Therefore, the ceremony on 14 September 2018 was conducted to both dedicate the new national memorial and to commemorate 70 years of Australia's involvement in peacekeeping missions.

The ceremony was attended by peacekeeping veterans and their families from around Australia, current peacekeepers both from Australia and other countries, a number of ambassadors to Australia, and members of the general public.

As part of the dedication ceremony, the local aboriginal tribe, the Ngunnawal, was acknowledged as the first people of the land on which the memorial was built, and representatives of the Ngunnawal conducted a "welcome to country" ceremony.

== Ceremonies on site ==
Between 2008 and 2016 ceremonies to mark Peacekeeping Day were held on the site of the future peacekeeping memorial. A temporary memorial (colloquially referred to as a "sandbag memorial") was erected on each occasion and a non-denominational service was conducted to remember and honour the service and sacrifice of Australian peacekeepers and their families. A catafalque party was provided by Australia's Federation Guard (including an officer of the Australian Federal Police), and a small band provided by the Royal Military College Duntroon, both elements of the Australian Defence Force. The ceremonies were well attended by veterans, federal and state politicians, senior officers and officials of the ADF, AFP and government departments, and foreign dignitaries. Each ceremony was organised by the APMP Committee.

Ceremonies after the dedication of the memorial in 2017 will be organised by individual or collective veterans' associations, or any other group wishing to do so. No one association has oversight of the memorial. The approval of the National Capital Authority is required to hold any ceremony at the memorial, as is the case for all ceremonies at any of the memorials along Anzac Parade in Canberra.

== Long Term Maintenance ==
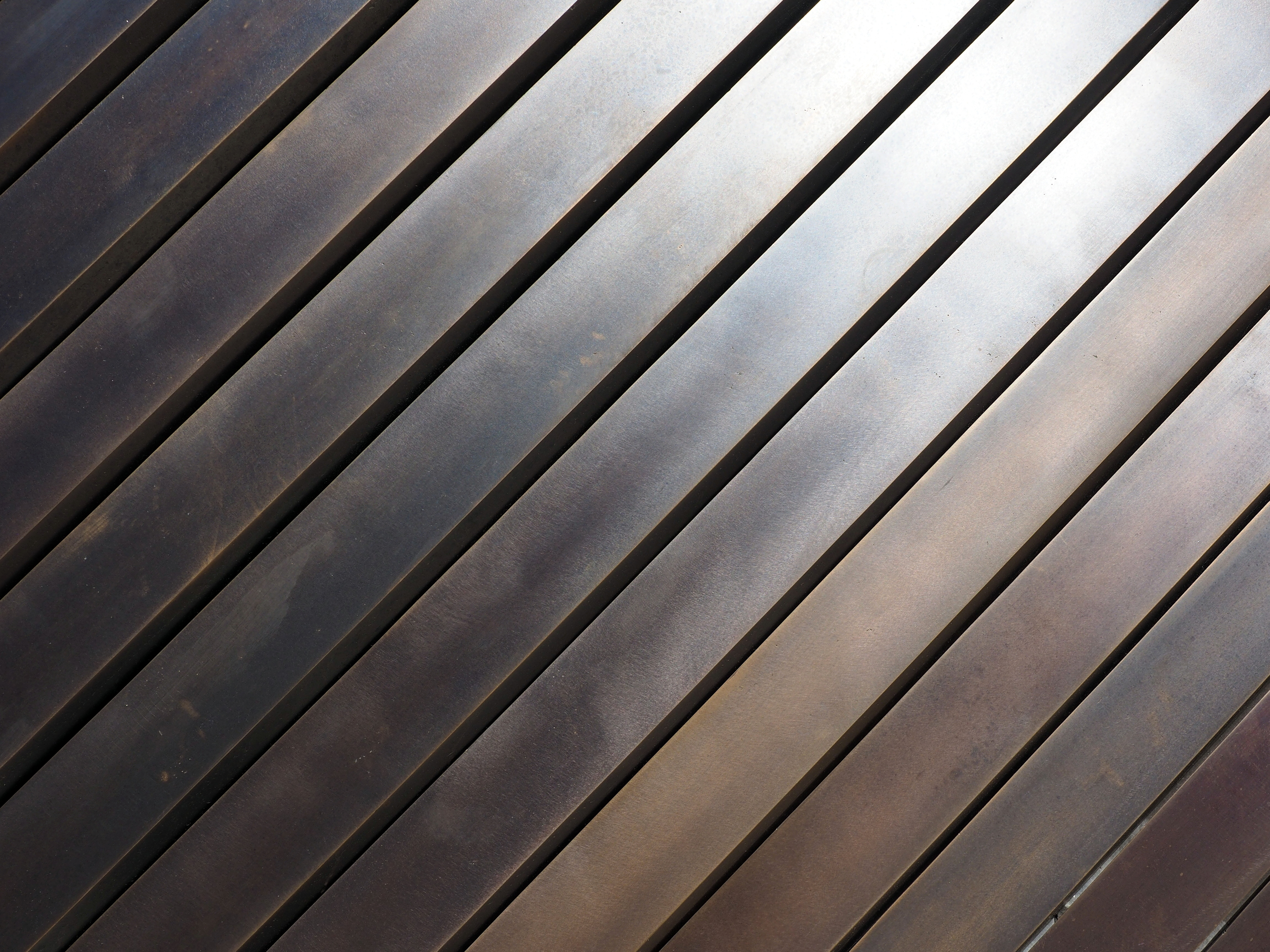
Blank panels reserved for listing future deployments on the Australian Peacekeeping Memorial

The National Capital Authority is responsible for the long-term care and maintenance of the memorial. The NCA also has the responsibility to coordinate and arrange for changes made to the memorial's mission beam. For each new peacekeeping mission to which Australians are deployed a new mission plaque will be added, and the plaque for any current missions which are completed will be altered to reflect the year of completion.

== Peacekeeping Missions ==
The peacekeeping memorial identifies all of the peacekeeping missions and peace operations in which Australia has participated. At the time of dedication of the memorial there had been 62 such missions.
