= Anzac Parade, Canberra =

Road in Canberra, Australia

Anzac Parade Australian Capital Territory
- Looking down Anzac Parade from the Australian War Memorial

General information
- Type: Road
- Length: 1.1 km (0.7 mi)
- Former route number: ACT Tourist Route 3

Major junctions
- Northeast end: Limestone Avenue; Fairbairn Avenue; Campbell, Australian Capital Territory
- Constitution Avenue
- Southwest end: Parkes Way; Lake Burley Griffin

Location(s)
- Major suburbs: Campbell, Reid

Anzac Parade is a major arterial road and thoroughfare in the Australian capital city of Canberra, connecting the Australian War Memorial with Constitution Avenue, Parkes Way and Lake Burley Griffin. It is used for ceremonial occasions, such as Anzac Day services, and is the site of many military memorials.

Named in honour of the Australian and New Zealand Army Corps (ANZAC) of World War I, Anzac Parade joins Gallipoli Reach of Lake Burley Griffin in the south and the Australian War Memorial to the north. As the main axis between Parliament House and Mount Ainslie, it bisects Constitution Avenue, which forms one side of the Parliamentary Triangle between Civic and Russell Hill.

The Parade is flanked by Victorian blue gum eucalyptus trees on gently sloping banks either side of the three-lane, one-way roads centred by a wide parade ground topped with granulated rock (similar to scoria), with planted boxes of a low bush called Hebe. The eucalypts are Australian; and the hebe comes from New Zealand. The Parade is also flanked by the streets of Anzac Park West and Anzac Park East on either side of Anzac Park.

On Anzac Day (25 April) and other ceremonial occasions, the Parade and adjoining streets may be blocked off to provide a parade route for formed groups of armed services personnel and veterans to proceed either along the central parade ground or the flanking roads. Removable concrete kerbs to facilitate marching along the central parade route are at the cross streets of Parkes Way, Constitution Avenue, Currong Street/Blamey Crescent, and Limestone Avenue/Fairbairn Avenue.

== Memorial interpretation ==
Anzac Parade – Memorials (north to south)
Australian War Memorial
Limestone Avenue (roundabout) Fairbairn Avenue
Hellenic/Greek		Kemal Atatürk /Turkey
space for memorial		space for memorial
Australian Army		Australian Navy
Currong Street South/Blamey Crescent
Korean War	Parade	Service Nurses
Vietnam Forces	Parade	Air Force
Mounted	Parade	Rats of Tobruk
Boer War	Parade	Peacekeeping
Australia 'basket'	Parade	New Zealand 'basket'
Constitution Avenue
Anzac Park West offices		Anzac Park East offices
Parkes Way (fountain) Parkes Way
service road / parking area
space for memorial	Rond Terrace	Emergency Services
Lake Burley Griffin

In the manner of interpretation of museum displays, the memorials are accompanied by several forms of signage to assist the passer-by. Each memorial has various plaques or foundation stones that were laid at the time of unveiling. Additionally, interpretative signage in a common format has been provided by the Government of Australia adjacent to each memorial that gives succinct information about the nature and/or the site of the people or group or events leading to the establishment of the memorial.

== Situation and history ==
Anzac Parade is situated on the main axis between Parliament House and Mount Ainslie. It bisects Constitution Avenue, which forms one side of the Parliamentary Triangle between Civic and Russell Hill.

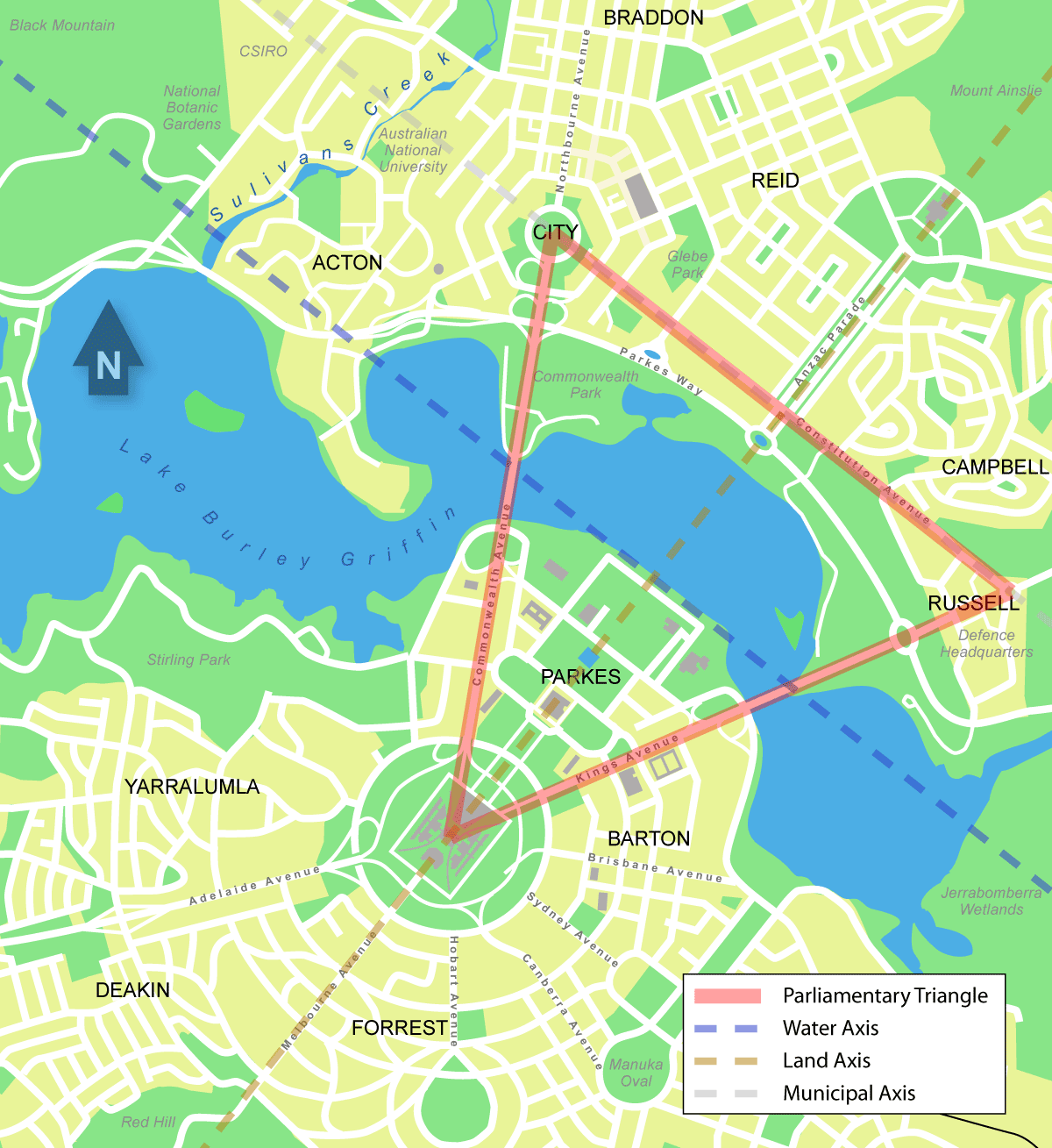
Anzac Parade, positioned on Canberra's Land Axis

The Parade separates the residential suburbs of Campbell and Reid. The naming is significant:

- Robert Campbell, Sydney's first merchant, received a grant of land on the Limestone Plains as compensation for the loss of one of his ships on government charter. In 1825 he built a homestead, naming it Duntroon after the Campbell castle in Argyllshire, Scotland. Duntroon House is now part of the Royal Military College, Duntroon.
- The Right Honourable Sir George Houston Reid (1845–1918) was Australia's fourth Prime Minister who formed a Government in August 1904 and held office until July 1905. A Federalist, and one of the founders of the Australian Constitution, he entered the Australian House of Representatives after having been Premier of New South Wales from 1894 to 1898.

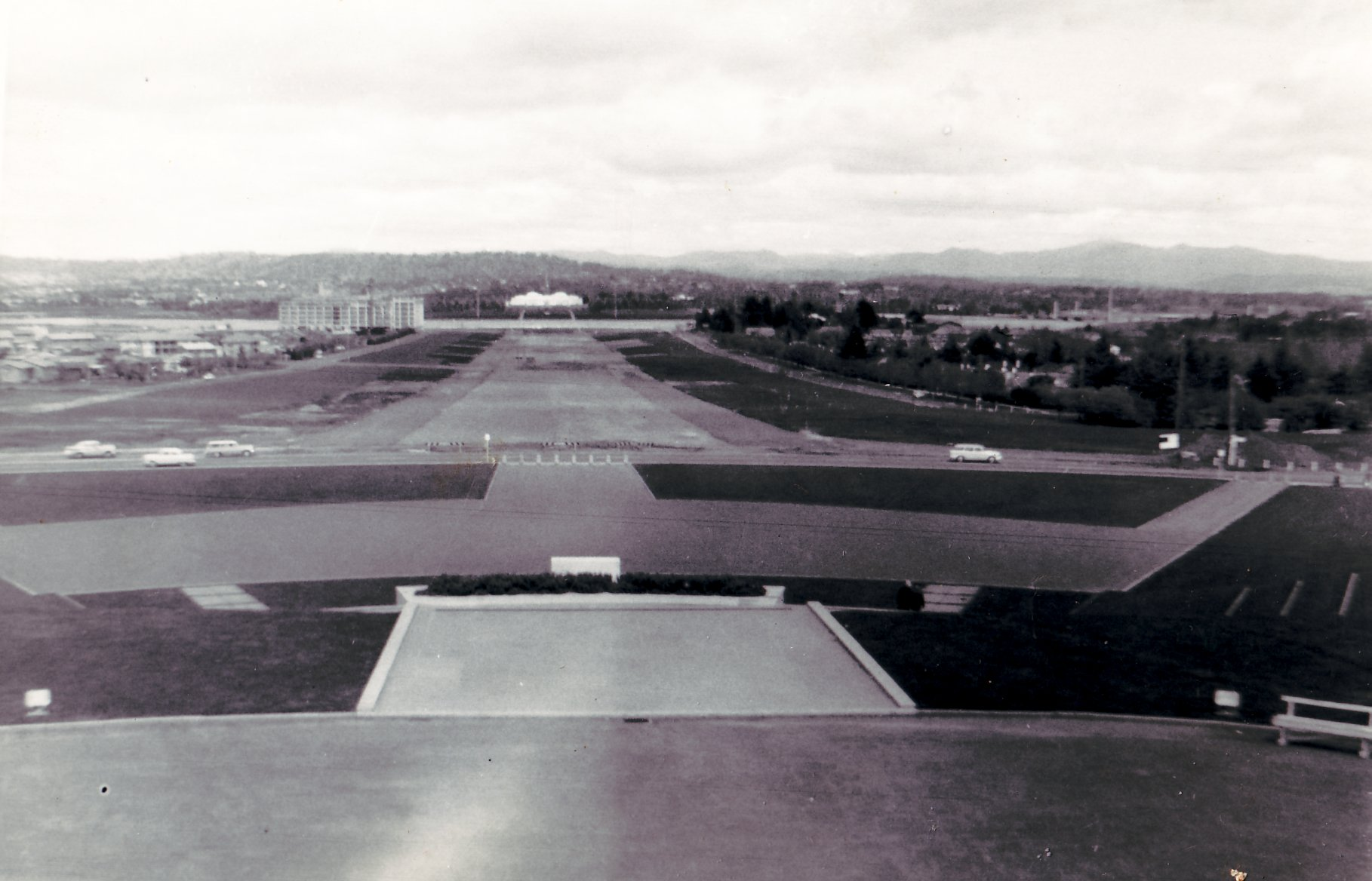
Anzac Parade in 1964

At the corner of Anzac Parade and Constitution Avenue is the historic St John the Baptist Anglican Church, consecrated by the Bishop of Australia, William Broughton, on 12 March 1845, some 80 years before the site of the national capital was decided. Fortuitously, the alignment of the church was such that it seems to have been designed to fit the alignment of the adjoining roads, ordained in the plans by Walter Burley Griffin.

== Lighting ==
The original lighting was designed to be a symbolic "honour guard" and was opened by then Prime Minister, Robert Menzies, on Anzac Day 25 April 1965. The street lighting was updated and officially opened on 26 March 2001 by then Prime Minister of Australia, John Howard. The design is intended to be efficient, and to reduce energy consumption and thus air pollution while also reducing skyglow/light pollution.

== Heritage listing ==
On Anzac Day 25 April 2006 Federal Environment and Heritage Minister Ian Campbell announced that Anzac Parade along with the Australian War Memorial would be added to the National Heritage List.
