= Rue-du-Bois Military Cemetery =

Cemetery in Pas-de-Calais, France

- Commonwealth War Graves Commission
- For Allied forces from World War I
- Established: 1914
- Location: 50°37′45″N 02°49′21″E near Fleurbaix
- Designed by: Sir Herbert Baker
- Total burials: 845

Burials by nation
- United Kingdom (597); Australia (241); New Zealand (5); British India (1); Germany (1)

Burials by war
- World War I

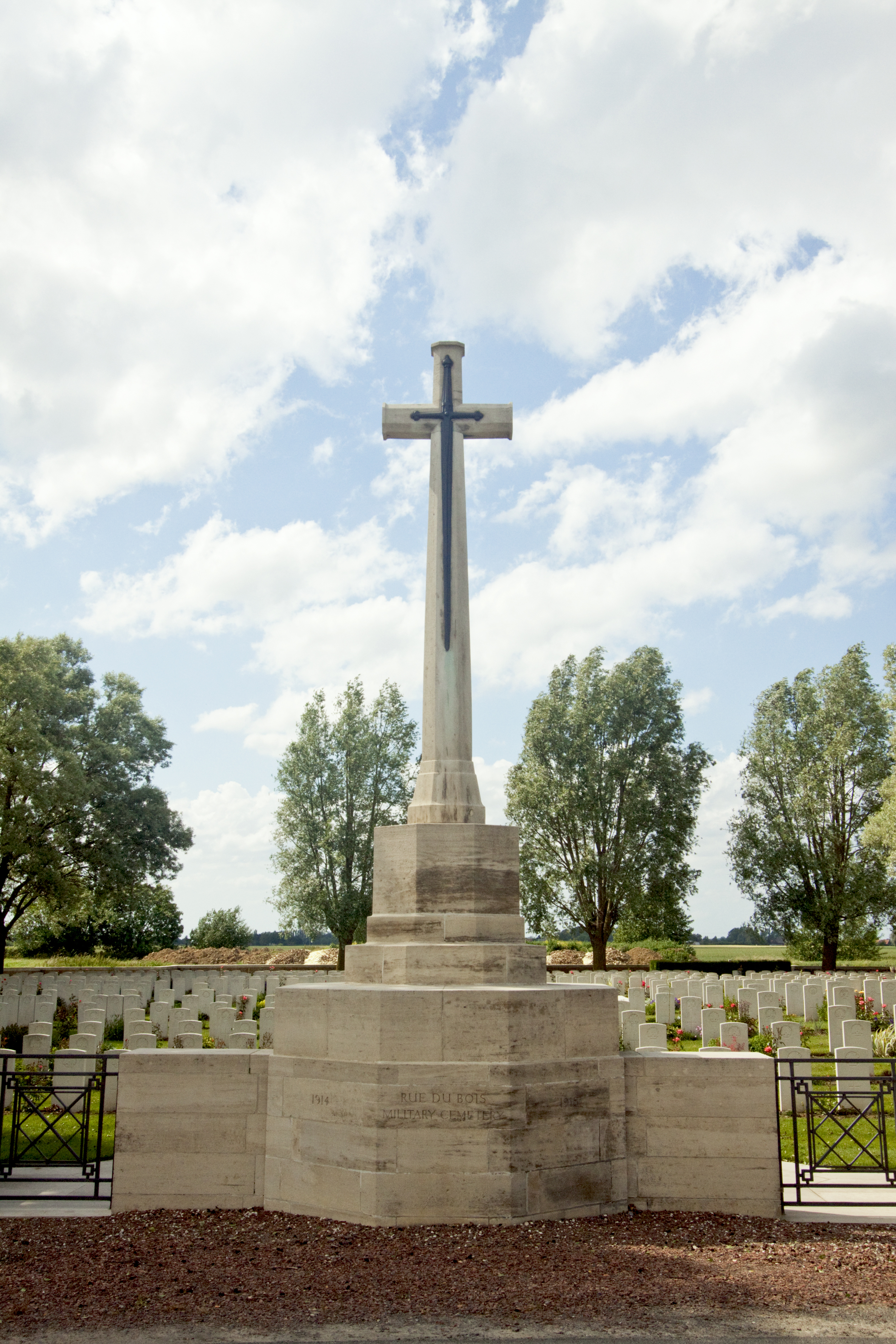

The Rue-du-Bois Military Cemetery is a World War I cemetery located in the commune of Fleurbaix, in the Pas-de-Calais departement of France, about 3 kilometres (1.9 mi) southwest of the village of Fleurbaix. It was designed by Sir Herbert Baker.

The original Rue-du-Bois Cemetery was begun in November 1914 and used until December 1916. The village was in Allied hands until 9 April 1918, when it was captured by the Germans after a gallant defense by the 12th Suffolks. It remained within German lines until September 1918 and the cemetery was reopened in October. After the Armistice, 423 coffins were brought to Rue-du-Boisin from the surrounding battlefields and from small cemeteries, including the Laventie Military Cemetery, the Picantin Post Cemeteries, and the Tilloloy Cemetery.

There are 845 Commonwealth graves from World War I. The majority are Australian, including the graves of 27 soldiers of the 5th Australian Division who died in the Attack at Fromelles (19-20 July 1916). There is one German grave and 53 graves of soldiers from the Ox and Bucks Light Infantry. There are 395 burials of unidentified casualties.

== See also ==
- Le Trou Aid Post Cemetery
- V.C. Corner Australian Cemetery and Memorial
- Fromelles (Pheasant Wood) Military Cemetery
