= Herbert Bolt =

Australian rugby league player

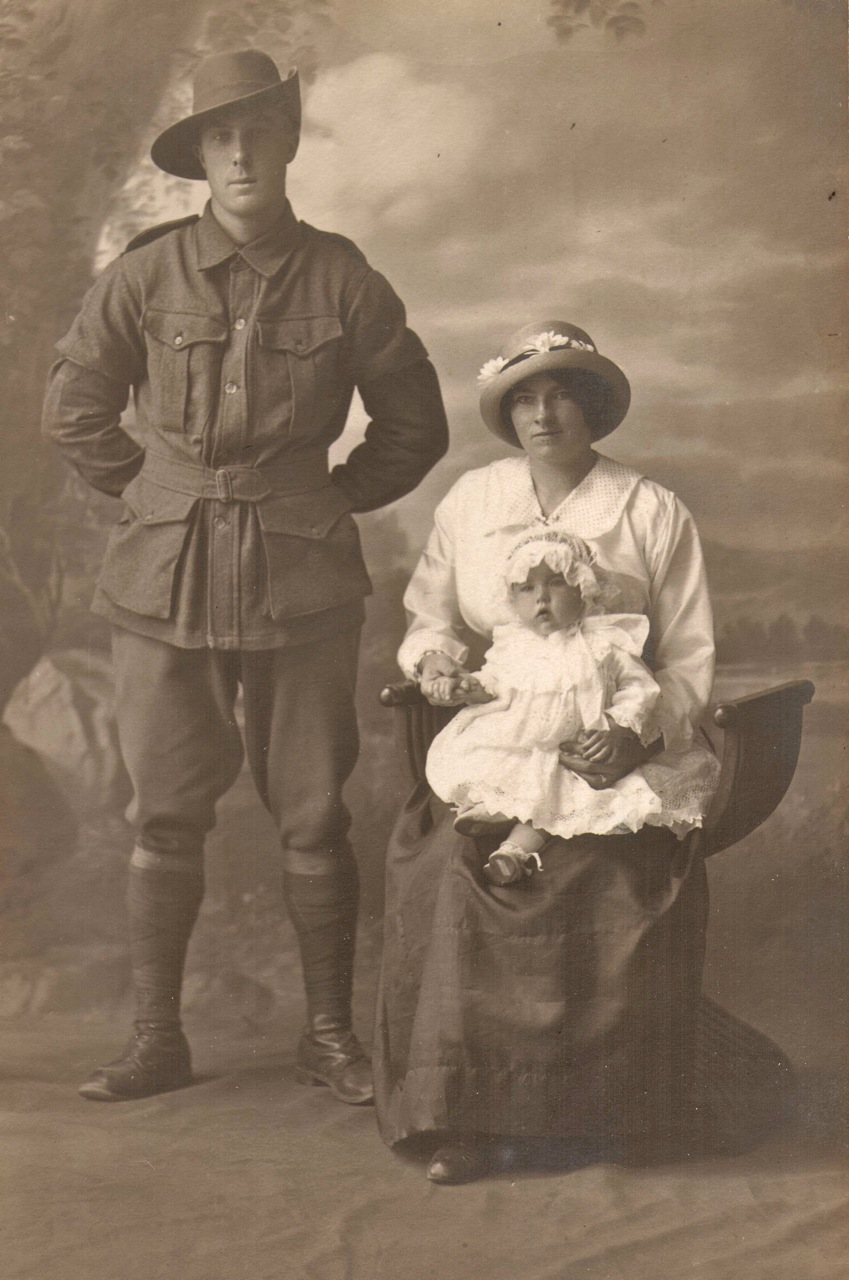
- Herbert, Jennie and baby Mona – 1915

Personal information
- Full name: Herbert Thomas Bolt
- Born: 10 September 1893 Newtown, New South Wales, Australia
- Died: 20 July 1916 (aged 22) Fleurbaix, France

Playing information
- Position: Back
Club
Years	Team	Pld	T	G	FG	P
1912–15	Newtown	42	4	3	0	18
Representative
Years	Team	Pld	T	G	FG	P
1913	New South Wales	2	2	0	0	6
- Relatives: Percy Bolt (brother)
- Military career
- Allegiance: Australia
- Branch: Australian Army
- Service years: 1915-1916
- Unit: First Australian Imperial Force
- Conflicts: World War I; Western Front; Battle of Fromelles †

Herbert Thomas Bolt (1893–1916) was a pioneer Australian rugby league player, a state representative centre and soldier who served and fell in World War I. He is one of 75 Australian soldiers whose remains were identified by name in 2010 by the Commonwealth War Graves Commission as part of the Fromelles Military Cemetery project.

== Rugby league career ==
Born and raised in Newtown, Sydney, Bolt made 46 appearances (42 Premiership and 4 City Cup) for the Newtown Bluebags between 1912 and 1915. He represented New South Wales in all four matches on the 1913 tour of Queensland playing in the centres, scoring two tries in the first match against Queensland and being sent off in the second. He also played two minor matches on tour against Northern New South Wales in Newcastle, and Queensland Rugby Union Converts in Brisbane.

== War service ==
Although married with an infant daughter, Bolt enlisted in the First Australian Imperial Force in September 1915. He was working as a brickmaker at the time of his enlistment, living at Bexley, south of Sydney. He left Australia on board HMAT A29 Suevic on 23 December 1915 as a member of the seventh reinforcement sent to strengthen 17th Battalion, 5th Brigade, 2nd Division.

Upon arrival in Egypt in February 1916, Bolt was allotted to 55th Battalion, 14th Brigade, 5th Division within II Anzac Corps. When the more experienced I Anzac Corps embarked for France at the end of the month, they took most of the available artillery pieces and trained personnel, leaving the II Anzac divisions to commence artillery training with almost no equipment. Bolt was promoted to corporal at the end of the training period. 5th Division began arriving in France in July, the last of the four Australian divisions from Egypt to do so; they would be the first to see major action on the Western Front at the Battle of Fromelles, just one week after arriving in the trenches.

Lieutenant-General Richard Haking, commander of the British XI Corps that adjoined II Anzac Corps to the south, planned an attack to reduce the slight German salient known as the "Sugar Loaf", north-west of the German-held town of Fromelles. 5th Division happened to be the unit facing the northern flank of the salient. By the time the attack was ready to be launched, its purpose as a preliminary diversion to the main action at the Somme had passed, yet Haking and his army commander, General Sir Charles Monro, were keen to go ahead. At 6pm on 19 July, after 11 hours of preliminary bombardment, 5th Division and the British 61st Division attacked. The Australian 8th and 14th Brigades, attacking north of the salient, occupied the German trenches but became isolated and out-flanked.

The AIF Project quotes a statement taken from Bolt's friend, Private Francis Johnston of 55th Battalion, who survived Fromelles but witnessed Bolt's death:

On the morning of 20 July 1916 at about 5am at Fleurbaix, Nutsy [Bolt] and I were close to one another when we were attacked by the Germans. He got more than six of them with his bayonet and the butt of his rifle, when he got a bullet through the head. He fell instantly being killed outright. He was as game as any man and was a well-known Newtown footballer.

The battle was responsible for the greatest loss of Australian lives in one 24-hour period. The 5,533 Australian casualties, including 400 prisoners, were equivalent to the total Australian losses in the Boer War, Korean War, and Vietnam War combined. It would be many months before the Australian 5th Division was serviceable again.

On the news of his death the Newtown club rallied to raise funds for his widow and child. Events included a fancy dress parade down King Street and then on to Erskineville Oval where a series of novelty events were held. With the money raised the club was able to purchase a house for Bolt's widow and daughter.

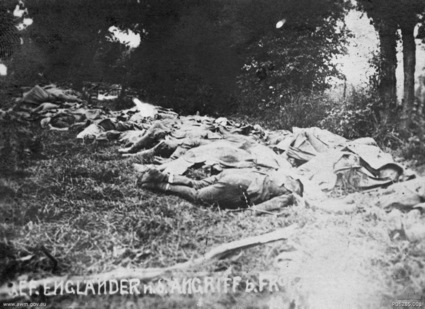
A German propaganda postcard showing dead "English" soldiers (according to the German caption) arranged in a wooded area near Fromelles just after the battle of 19–20 July 1916.

Bolt's remains were identified in 2010 as being in a forgotten mass grave at Pheasant Wood. Research by an Australian amateur historian, Lambis Englezos, had identified a site in a field at the edge of Bois Faisan on the outskirts of Fromelles. Bodies had been transported there by German soldiers on a narrow gauge trench railway on 22 July 1916, before being buried in eight pits measuring approximately 10 metres (33 ft) long, 2.2 metres (7 ft 3 in) wide and 5 metres (16 ft) deep. Englezos believed that these grave pits had not been discovered during the official post-war burial campaigns. After extensive archaeological surveys the mass grave was confirmed and remains were exhumed and tested against DNA samples of living relatives of the deceased soldiers. Herbert Bolt's remains were reinterred in the Fromelles (Pheasant Wood) Military Cemetery in July 2010.

== Sources ==
=== Bibliography ===
- Whiticker, Alan & Hudson, Glen (2006) The Encyclopedia of Rugby League Players, Gavin Allen Publishing, Sydney
- Williams, Terry (2008) Through Blue Eyes: A Photographic History of Newtown RLFC, Newtown RLFC, Leichhardt
