= Le Trou Aid Post Cemetery =

Cemetery located in Pas-de-Calais, in France

- Commonwealth War Graves Commission
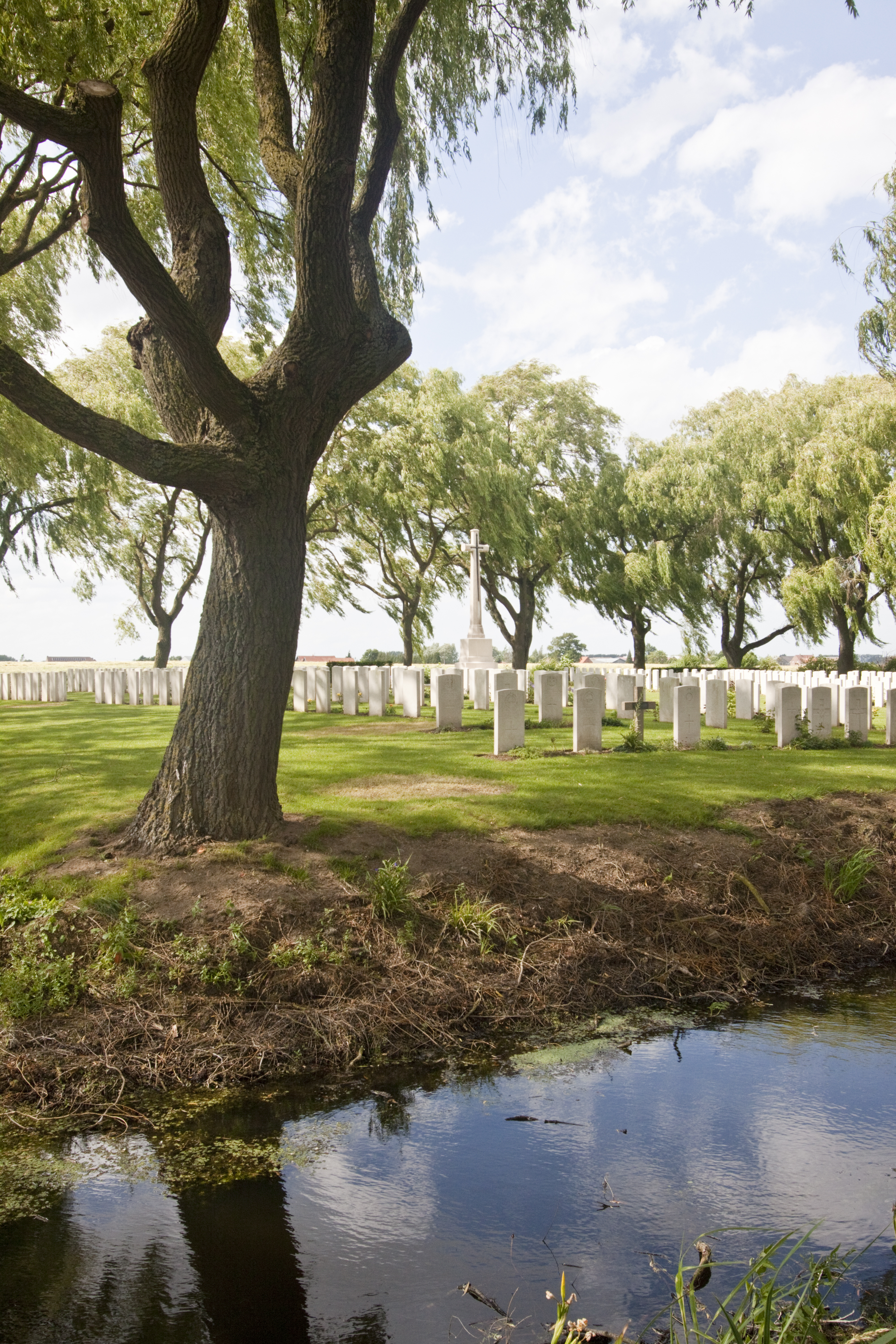
- Le Trou Aid Post
- For Allied war dead of World War I
- Established: October 1914
- Location: 50°37′26″N 02°49′35″E near Fleurbaix
- Designed by: Sir Herbert Baker
- Total burials: 350+
- Unknowns: 200+

Burials by nation
- United Kingdom; British Commonwealth; France
- Statistics source: Commonwealth War Graves Commission

The Le Trou Aid Post Cemetery is a World War I cemetery located in the commune of Fleurbaix, in the Pas-de-Calais departement of France, about 3 kilometres (1.9 mi) south of the village of Fleurbaix on the D175 road (rue de Pétillon).

British soldiers of the 19th Infantry Brigade made the earliest burials at the site in October 1914 during the First Battle of Ypres. By the end of the war, the cemetery contained 123 graves. This number nearly tripled after a postwar consolidation of war burial sites, when Le Trou Aid Post was expanded by the architect Sir Herbert Baker.

Described as one of Baker's most sentimental works, the rural site is surrounded by a narrow moat and sheltered by a grove of weeping willows. Visitors approach over a footbridge and enter through a delicate cottage-style gateway.

The cemetery contains more than 350 graves, and over two hundred are unidentified. The dead represent the battlefields of Ypres, Le Maisnil (October 1914), Aubers Ridge (May 1915), Loos (September–October 1915), and Fromelles (July 1916).

== See also ==
- Rue-du-Bois Military Cemetery
- V.C. Corner Australian Cemetery and Memorial
- Fromelles (Pheasant Wood) Military Cemetery
