= Fromelles Military Cemetery =

Fromelles Military Cemetery can mean:

- V.C. Corner Australian Cemetery and Memorial, 2 kilometres northwest of the village of Fromelles
- Fromelles (Pheasant Wood) Military Cemetery, on the outskirts of the village itself
