= Australian Memorial Park =

War memorial in France

- Australia,
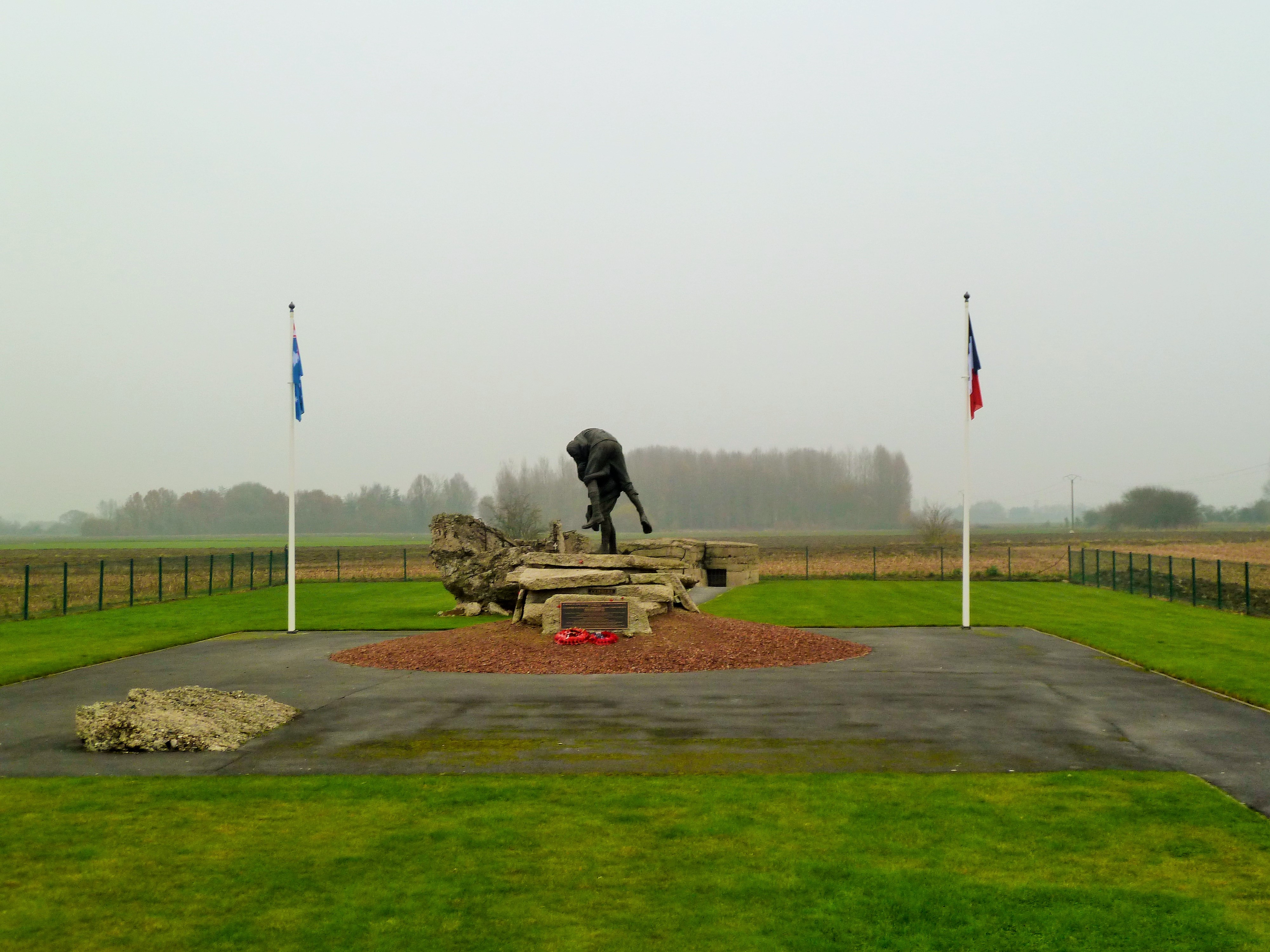
- Australian Memorial Park
- For Australian forces at the Battle of Fromelles
- Location: 50°37′5″N 02°50′8″E FRANCE
- Designed by: Peter Corlett (statue)

The Australian Memorial Park is a World War I memorial, located near Fromelles, France, commemorating Australians killed during the Battle of Fromelles.

== Location ==
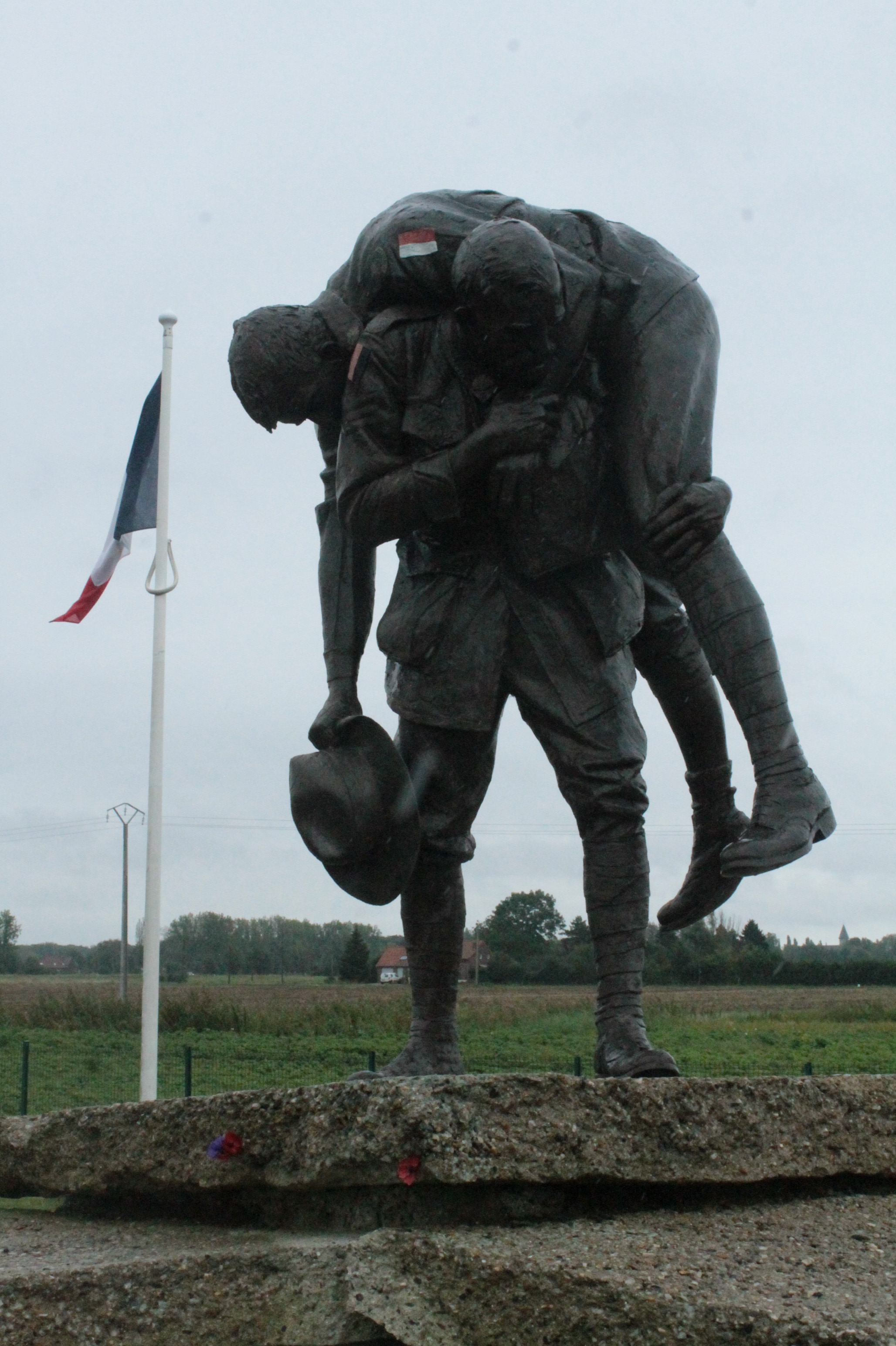
Cobbers statue at the Australian Memorial Park

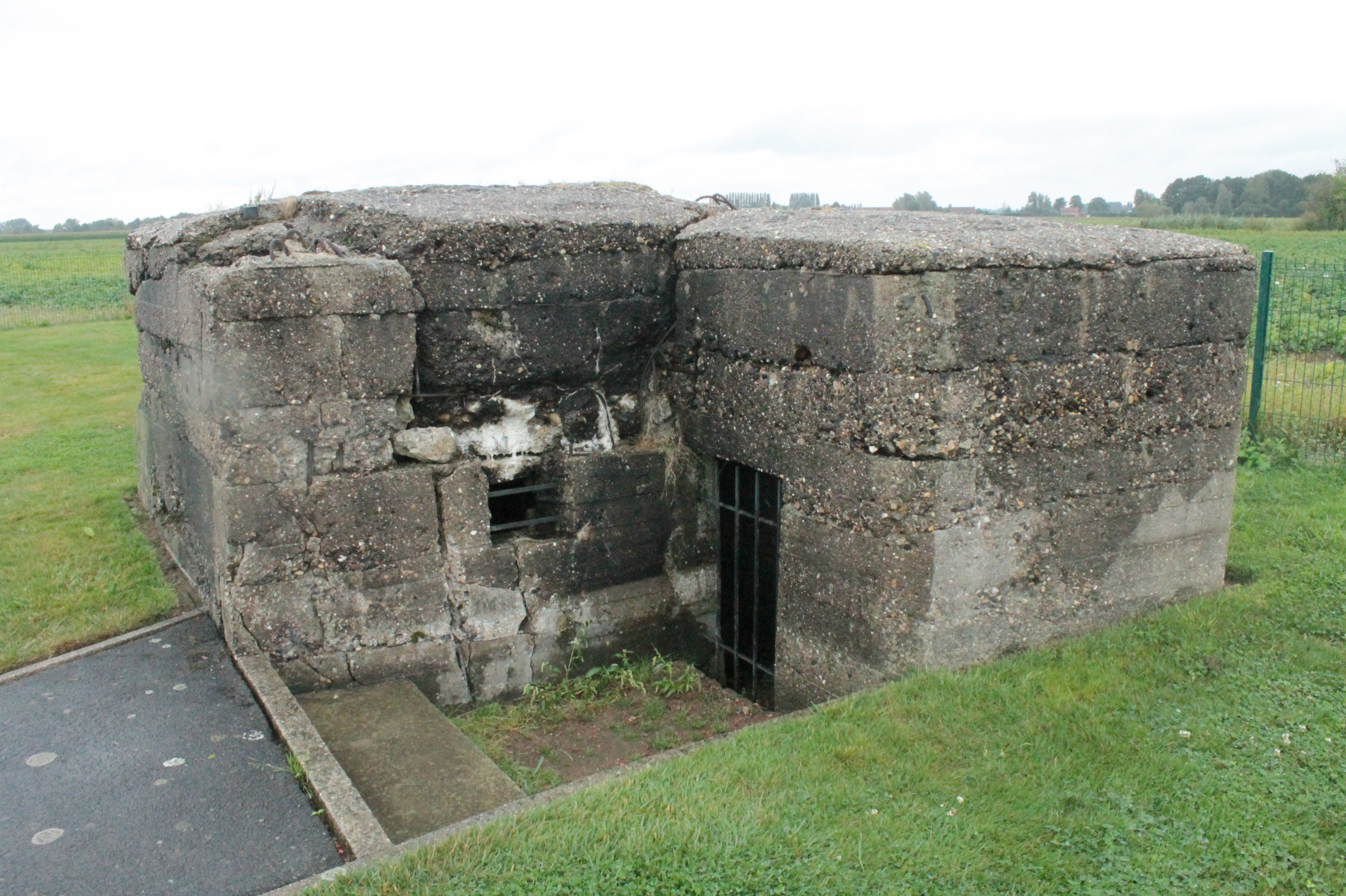
German bunker retained at Australian Memorial Park

The memorial park, which was designed by Herbert Baker, is located approximately 200 metres (660 ft) east of the V.C. Corner Australian Cemetery and Memorial, on the same road in the direction of the village of Fromelles in France. It lies at the point where the German lines crossed the road, and has several surviving battlefield fortifications. In comparison, the V.C. Corner cemetery and memorial is approximately at the point where the Allied lines crossed the road.

== Inauguration ==
The Memorial Park was opened on 5 July 1998 by Bruce Scott, the Australian Minister for Veterans' Affairs, in the presence of Ian McLachlan, the Australian Minister for Defence. The opening of this memorial park was part of a series of events that commemorated the 80th anniversary of the end of World War I. A guard of honour was provided by the French 43rd Infantry Regiment, and the Australian 10th/27th Battalion, and the opening of the memorial park was attended by hundreds from Australia and France.

== Memorial ==
Cobbers is a prominent 1998 sculpture by Peter Corlett of Sergeant Simon Fraser (Note: Fraser (born 31 December 1876, Byaduk, Victoria) would rise to the rank of lieutenant. He was killed in action 11 May 1917.) rescuing a wounded compatriot from No Man's Land after the battle. A replica of the sculpture is in the Shrine of Remembrance in Melbourne, Victoria. The title comes from a letter that Fraser, a farmer from Byaduk, Victoria, wrote a few days after the battle and that was widely quoted in Australia's official history of World War I.

We found a fine haul of wounded and brought them in; but it was not where I heard this fellow calling, so I had another shot for it, and came across a splendid specimen of humanity trying to wriggle into a trench with a big wound in his thigh. He was about 14 stone weight, and I could not lift him on my back; but I managed to get him into an old trench, and told him to lie quiet while I got a stretcher. Then another man about 30 yards out sang out "Don’t forget me, cobber." I went in and got four volunteers with stretchers, and we got both men in safely.

Several commemorative events have been held at the Memorial Park. On 9 May 2009, a Service of Remembrance was held to mark the 94th anniversary of the Battle of Aubers Ridge. On 19 July 2009, a service was held to mark the 93rd anniversary of the Battle of Fromelles.

== See also ==
- Mont Saint-Quentin Australian war memorial
- V.C. Corner Australian Cemetery and Memorial
- Villers–Bretonneux Australian National Memorial
- Military Memorials of National Significance in Australia
