= Percy Bolt =

Australian rugby league footballer

Personal information
- Full name: Percy Bolt
- Born: 1885 Redfern, New South Wales, Australia
- Died: 14 October 1953 (aged 67–68) Stanmore, New South Wales, Australia

Playing information
- Position: Five-eighth
Club
Years	Team	Pld	T	G	FG	P
1910	Western Suburbs	8	0	0	0	0
1911	Annandale	1	0	0	0	0
	Total	9	0	0	0	0
- Source: Whiticker/Huddon
- Relatives: Herbert Bolt (brother)

Percy Bolt (1885–1953) was an Australian pioneer rugby league footballer who played in the 1910s.

== Playing career ==
Bolt was a rugby union convert who joined Western Suburbs in 1910 and captained the club that year. He joined the stronger Annandale club in 1911 but he retired by year's end.

== Death ==
Bolt died at his Stanmore home on 14 October 1953, aged 68.
