= Mont Saint-Quentin Australian war memorial =

Australian war memorial

2nd Division Memorial
- Australia
- For Australian 2nd Division
- Established: 1971
- Location: 49°56′50″N 2°55′57″E; Mont Saint-Quentin, Péronne, Somme, France
- Designed by: Stanley James Hammond

Mont Saint-Quentin Australian war memorial is an Australian First World War memorial located at Mont Saint-Quentin in Péronne, France. This monument was erected in honour of the fallen soldiers of the Australian Second Division during the Battle of Mont Saint-Quentin. It is one of five commemorative monuments initiated by the soldiers of the division. The memorial is located on the Bapaume-Péronne road (D1017).

== Historical Background ==
The Battle of Mont Saint-Quentin was a part of the Allied Hundred Days Offensive. The Australian Corps crossed the Somme River on the night of 31 August 1918 and attacked the German lines at Mont Saint-Quentin. The position was only 100 meters high but was a key German defensive position because it overlooked the Somme River and served as an ideal observation post, and guarded the north and western approaches to Péronne. The British Fourth Army's commander, General Henry Rawlinson, described the Australian advances of 31 August – 4 September as a great military achievement. In three days the Australians endured 3,000 casualties but ensured a general German withdrawal eastwards back to the Hindenburg Line.

== Original memorial ==
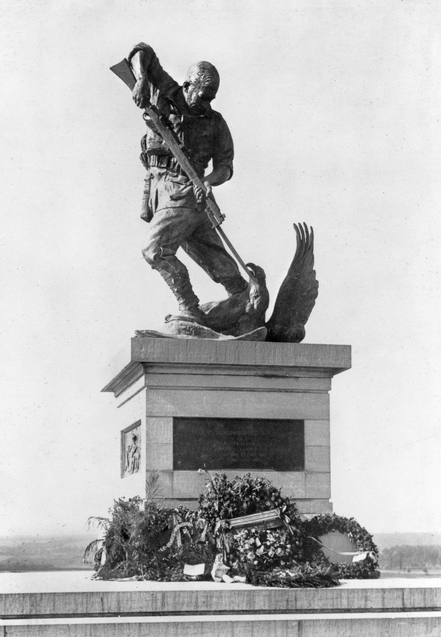
The original memorial

The original monument consisted of a pedestaled sculpture, created by Charles Web Gilbert, representing an Australian soldier thrusting his bayonet into a German eagle. The pedestal has bronze bas-reliefs created by May Butler-George that depict soldiers in combat, namely men hauling and pushing a gun and men advancing with bayoneted rifles and hand grenades. The memorial was inaugurated on August 30, 1925 and unveiled by Ferdinand Foch. In 1940, German soldiers destroyed the sculpture most probably due to the anti-German imagery.

== Present memorial ==
The plinth was not destroyed by German soldiers in 1940 and lay empty until 1971. A replacement sculpture titled Digger by Australian sculptor Stanley James Hammond was erected in 1971. The present-day sculpture is of a slouch-hatted Australian soldier with a slightly bowed head. The pedestal still includes the bronze bas-reliefs created by May Butler-George.

== See also ==
- List of Australian military memorials
- V.C. Corner Australian Cemetery and Memorial
- Villers–Bretonneux Australian National Memorial
- Military Memorials of National Significance in Australia
