= Fromelles =

- Commune
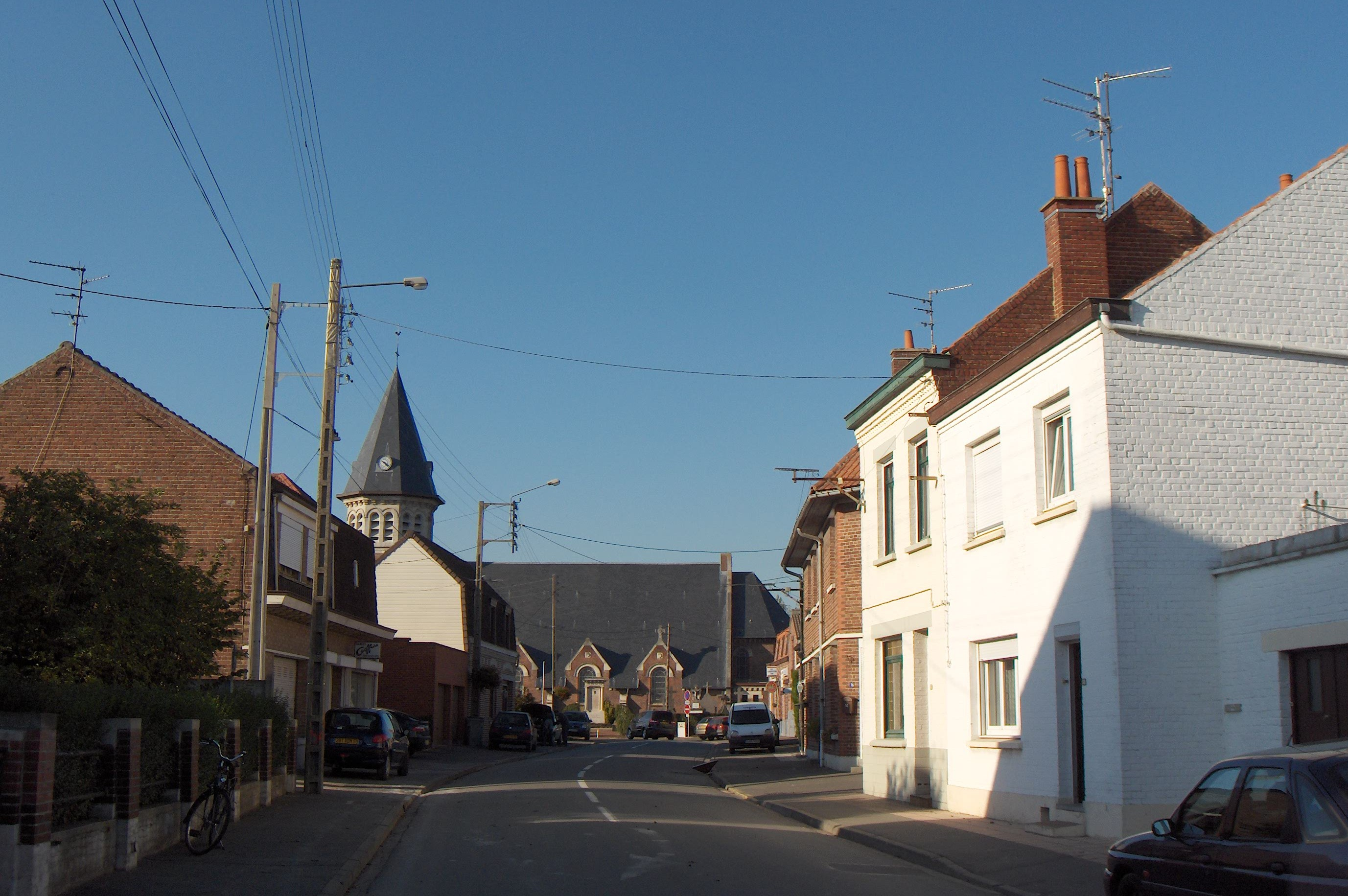
- Village of Fromelles

- Coat of arms
- Location of Fromelles
- Location within France Location within Hauts-de-France
- Coordinates: 50°36′25″N 2°51′21″E
- Country: France
- Region: Hauts-de-France
- Department: Nord
- Arrondissement: Lille
- Canton: Annœullin
- Intercommunality: Métropole Européenne de Lille

Government
  - Mayor (2020–2026): Jean-Gabriel Masson
- Area^{1}: 8.54 km^{2} (3.30 sq mi)
- Elevation: 85 m (279 ft)
- Highest elevation: 32 m (105 ft)
- Lowest elevation: 18 m (59 ft)
- Population (2023): 1,161
  - Density: 136/km^{2} (352/sq mi)
- Time zone: UTC+01:00 (CET)
  - Summer (DST): UTC+02:00 (CEST)
- INSEE/Postal code: 59257 /59249
- ^{1} French Land Register data, which excludes lakes, ponds, glaciers > 1 km^{2} (0.386 sq mi or 247 acres) and river estuaries.

Fromelles (pronounced [fʁɔmɛl]) is a commune in the Nord department in northern France. As of 2023, the population of the commune was 1,161; its inhabitants are called Fromellois. It is located about 16 kilometres (10 mi) to the west of Lille.

== First World War ==
The village of Fromelles was captured by advancing German forces on 9 October 1914 during the "Race to the Sea". Throughout almost the whole of the war, the front line was stable, running through the territory of the commune and leaving the inhabited area in German hands. The Battle of Aubers Ridge was fought in the area to the northwest of the village on 9 May 1915 as part of the Second Battle of Artois.

=== Battle of Fromelles ===
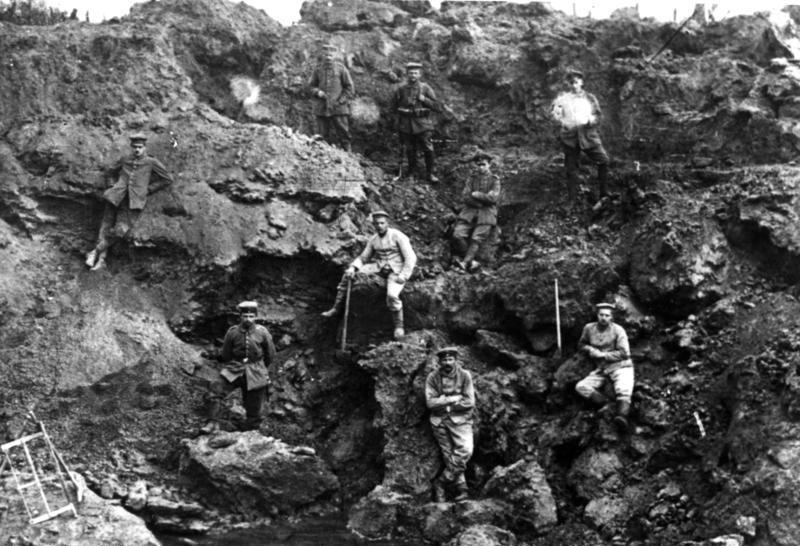
German soldiers posing on a crater left by the explosion of a mine. The photo is dated 9 May 1915, the start of the Battle of Aubers Ridge.

The Battle of Fromelles on 19–20 July 1916 was the first occasion on which the First Australian Imperial Force (AIF) saw action on the Western Front. The battle is widely regarded as a disaster for the Allies, and has been described as "the worst 24 hours in Australia's entire history." It resulted from a plan to divert German attention from the Battle of the Somme, but historians estimate that 5,500 Australians and 2,000 British troops were killed or wounded. The Australian losses were equivalent to the combined total Australian losses in the Boer War, Korean War and Vietnam War: although later World War I actions would be more deadly for the AIF, Fromelles was the only one to achieve no success.

Adolf Hitler is believed to have served as a messenger on the German side with the 6th Bavarian Reserve Division.

=== Cemeteries ===
Many difficulties faced frontline Allied units in the sector following the battle, and the Australian 5th Division found it necessary to bury 400 of its own dead, in a mass grave, about two kilometres north of Fromelles. This particular point on the frontline became known to British Empire troops as "V.C. Corner" (a name that was probably an ironic reference to the Victoria Cross).

On the other side of the lines, many Allied dead were likewise buried hastily by German forces. Following the war, many of these graves were located by the Imperial War Graves Commission (IWGC) and the remains therein were reburied at official cemeteries.

At V.C. Corner, the existing mass grave was augmented by the IWGC with unidentified remains found on the battlefield and some from other temporary or otherwise unsuitable sites. After the burial area was reconfigured, and marked with two large concrete crosses, it was officially dedicated, becoming the V.C. Corner Australian Cemetery and Memorial. The cemetery has remained one of only a few Commonwealth military cemeteries to have no individual headstones.

For at least 80 years, the remains of at least 399 Australian and British dead were to remain unaccounted for – even though soldiers' personal belongings had been returned to their families, and deaths had been independently investigated and confirmed by the Red Cross,

Following research in the Bavarian Army archives, between 2002 and 2007, by independent military historian Lambis Englezos, a large mass grave, on the outskirts of Fromelles, was identified. The Bois de Phaisan (Pheasant Wood) site, which was confirmed by archaeologists from Glasgow University in July 2007, was reportedly the largest mass grave of Western Allied soldiers to have been discovered since the end of World War I. A full disinterment was carried out in May–September 2009, and the bodies of 250 British and Australian soldiers were recovered. After DNA samples were taken, the bodies were reburied in individual graves, about 120 metres from their previous site, at the new Fromelles (Pheasant Wood) Military Cemetery.

During the four years of the Great War, British division after division fought in that area of the Western Front which we now know as Fromelles and which forms part of what is now referred to as “The Forgotten Front”. Prior to the discovery of the mass graves at Pheasant Wood, Fromelles was known only for being the place where the Australian Imperial Force had experienced its first, and disastrous, taste of action on the Western Front. Whilst Fromelles hosts both the CWGC memorial to the AIF at VC Corner and the Australian Memorial Park, with the exception of a small private memorial to an officer of the Rifle Brigade, no memorial to the British casualties exists in this area. British losses were numbered in their many thousands in and along this line, but the majority of the men killed in action in this area between 1914 and 1918 are commemorated on the Ploegsteert Memorial to the Missing in Belgium. A charitable association, known as the British Memorial Association, Fromelles, has been set up to establish a memorial in Fromelles, dedicated to the thousands of British men who gave their lives in this small corner of France, by educating people about the magnificent efforts of the British Army in this area of the ‘Forgotten Front’, the Association will endeavour to redress this balance and should be the first port of call for anyone, regardless of nationality, who is interested in Aubers Ridge and Fromelles throughout the Great War.

== See also ==
- Communes of the Nord department
