= V.C. Corner Australian Cemetery and Memorial =

WWI CWGC cemetery in Nord, France

- Commonwealth War Graves Commission
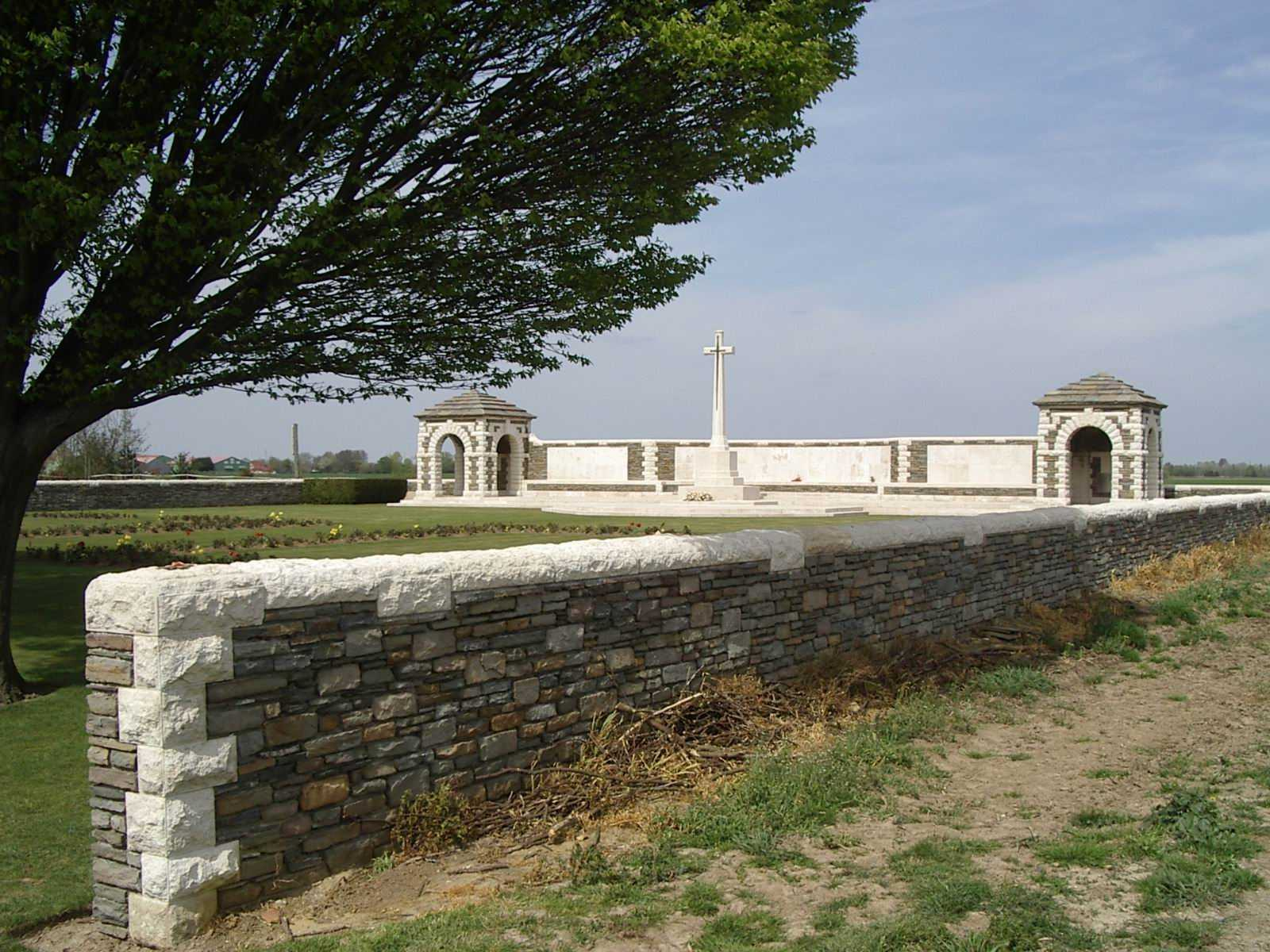
- View of the cemetery with the memorial in the background
- For Australian soldiers who were killed during the Battle of Fromelles and whose graves are not known
- Location: 50°37′11″N 02°50′2″E near Fromelles, France
- Designed by: Sir Herbert Baker (architect)
- Total burials: 410
- Unknowns: 410
- Commemorated: 1,299
- In honour of 410 unknown Australian soldiers here buried who were among the 1299 officers, non-commissioned officers and men of the Australian Imperial Forces killed in the attack at Fromelles July 19th/20th 1916

UNESCO World Heritage Site
- Official name: Funerary and memory sites of the First World War (Western Front)
- Type: Cultural
- Criteria: i, ii, vi
- Designated: 2023 (45th session)
- Reference no.: 1567-ND02

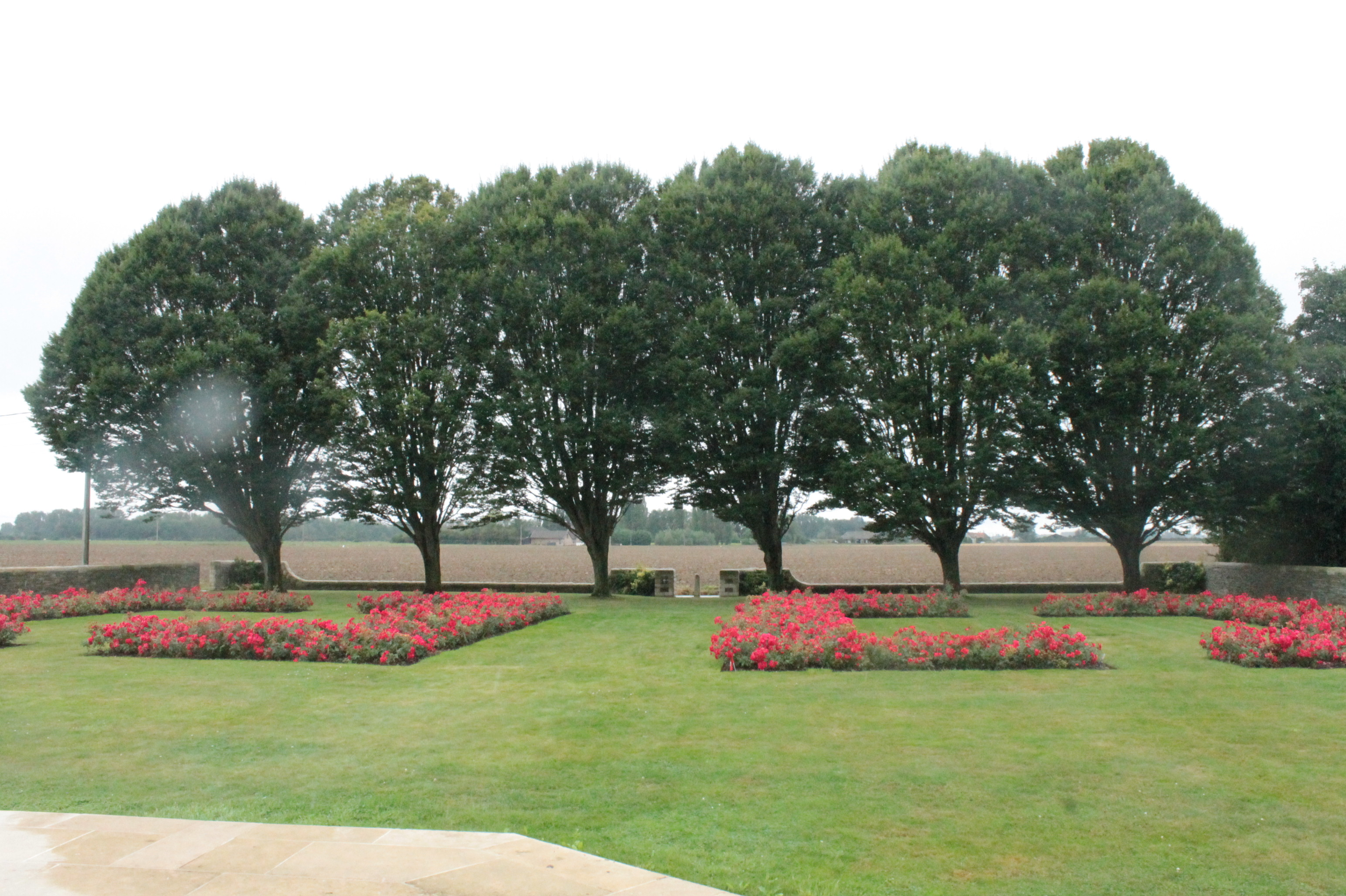
The burial areas at VC Corner Australian Cemetery

The V.C. Corner Australian Cemetery and Memorial is a Commonwealth War Graves Commission (CWGC) World War I cemetery and memorial. It is in the commune of Fromelles, in the Nord departement of France, about 2 kilometres (1.2 mi) northwest of the village of Fromelles on the D22C road (rue Delval).

== Battle of Fromelles ==
The Battle of Fromelles in July 1916 is significant as the first occasion on which the First Australian Imperial Force (AIF) saw action on the Western Front.

The battle is widely regarded as a disaster for the Allies, and has been described as "the worst 24 hours in Australia's entire history." It resulted from a plan to divert German attention from the Battle of the Somme, but historians estimate that 5,500 Australians and 2,000 British troops were killed or wounded. The Australian losses were equivalent to the combined total Australian losses in the Boer War, Korean War and Vietnam War: although later World War I actions would be more deadly for the AIF, Fromelles was the only one to achieve no success.

== Cemetery and memorial ==
The site was constructed in 1920 and 1921: The name VC Corner has no obvious relation to actions in the region of Fromelles. It might just refer to a nickname soldiers gave the area during the war referring either to the bravery of the Australian troops or the danger of the place that demanded bravery to be held.

The cemetery contains 410 unidentified bodies retrieved from the battlefield after the Armistice, that is, two years after the battle. There are no headstones in the cemetery to mark individual burials, and the mass burials are in two zones marked by flower beds, each with a large concrete cross at its centre. Although the graves are not individually marked, these are individual graves, not a mass grave, as can be seen on the CWGC cemetery plan. There is also a Cross of Sacrifice.

The memorial lists almost 1,300 Australian soldiers who were lost in the battle and who have no known resting place. (Note: Sources differ as to the exact number of soldiers commemorated at the memorial, with the CWGC putting the number at 1,296. The Office of Australian War Graves gives the figure of 1,333 AIF soldiers who died in the Battle of Fromelles and who have no known resting place, compared with 1,121 AIF soldiers buried in local cemeteries (including the 410 at V.C. Corner) as 'unknown'.) Of these, 711 are buried as "Known unto God" in other local cemeteries such as the Le Trou Aid Post Cemetery and the Rue-du-Bois Military Cemetery. The bodies of another 160 AIF soldiers (and 239 British soldiers) were recovered by the Germans after the battle and buried behind German lines – their names and personal belongings being passed to the Red Cross. In May 2008, the remains of some of these soldiers were located in mass graves on the outskirts of Fromelles. A total of 250 British and Australian soldiers from this site were later reburied in the Fromelles (Pheasant Wood) Military Cemetery.

== See also ==
- List of Australian military memorials
- Mont Saint-Quentin Australian war memorial
- Villers–Bretonneux Australian National Memorial
- Military Memorials of National Significance in Australia
