= Fleurbaix =

Fleurbaix Vloerbeek
- Commune
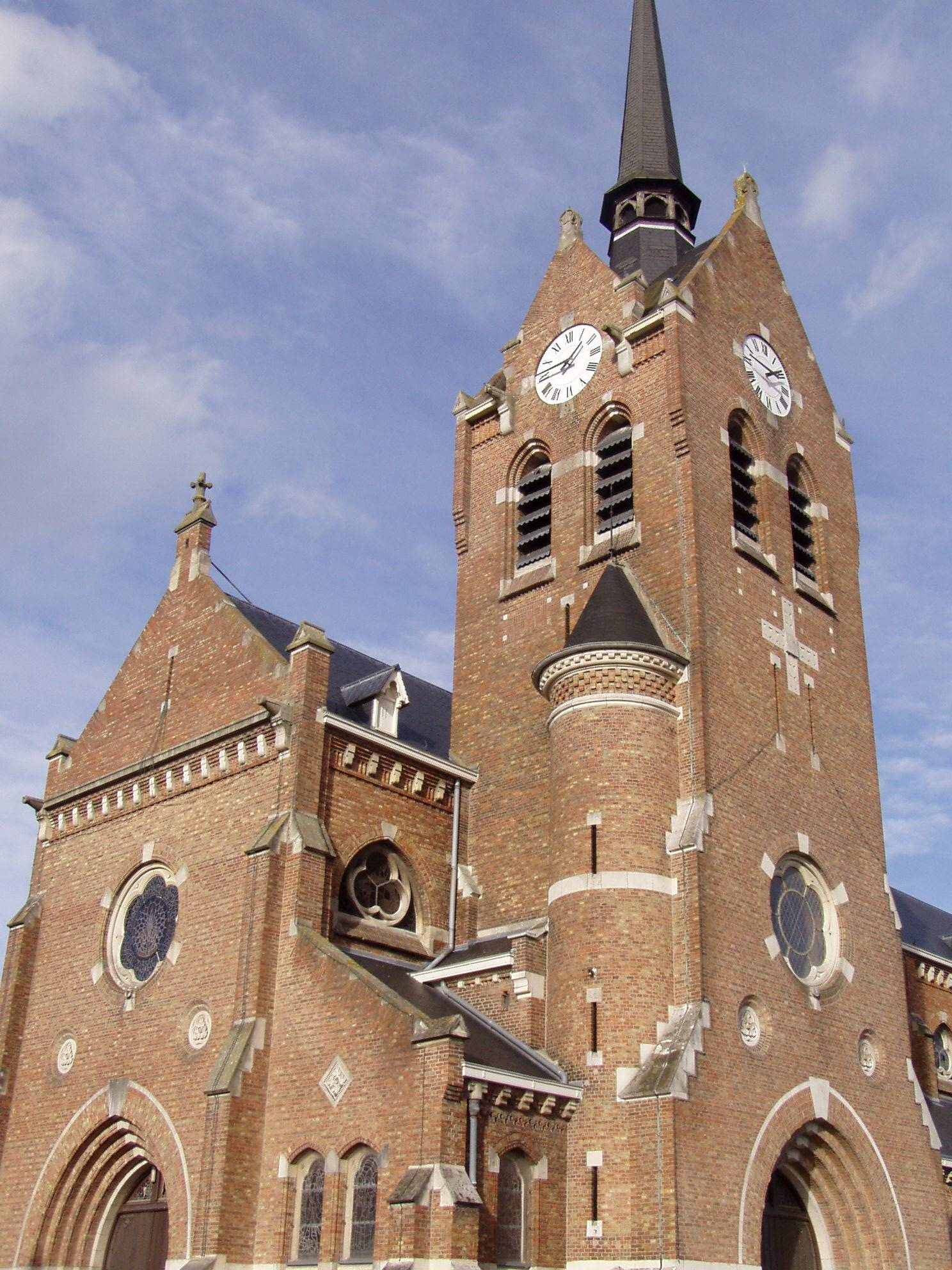
- The church of Fleurbaix

- Coat of arms
- Location of Fleurbaix
- Location within France Location within Hauts-de-France
- Coordinates: 50°39′11″N 2°50′01″E
- Country: France
- Region: Hauts-de-France
- Department: Pas-de-Calais
- Arrondissement: Béthune
- Canton: Beuvry
- Intercommunality: Flandre Lys

Government
  - Mayor (2020–2026): Aimé Delabre
- Area^{1}: 12.86 km^{2} (4.97 sq mi)
- Elevation: 18 m (59 ft)
- Highest elevation: 20 m (66 ft)
- Lowest elevation: 16 m (52 ft)
- Population (2023): 2,947
  - Density: 229.2/km^{2} (593.5/sq mi)
- Time zone: UTC+01:00 (CET)
  - Summer (DST): UTC+02:00 (CEST)
- INSEE/Postal code: 62338 /62840
- ^{1} French Land Register data, which excludes lakes, ponds, glaciers > 1 km^{2} (0.386 sq mi or 247 acres) and river estuaries.

Fleurbaix (French pronunciation: [flœʁbɛ]; West Flemish: Vloerbeek) is a commune in the Pas-de-Calais department in the Hauts-de-France region of France about 15 miles (24 km) northeast of Béthune and 13 miles (21 km) west of Lille, at the border with the department of Nord. A stream, the Becque du Biez, flows through the commune.

== Population ==
The inhabitants are called Fleurbaisiens in French.

Historical population
Year	Pop.	±% p.a.
1968	1,457	—
1975	1,647	+1.77%
1982	1,993	+2.76%
1990	2,221	+1.36%
1999	2,480	+1.23%
2007	2,682	+0.98%
2012	2,605	−0.58%
2017	2,732	+0.96%
2023	2,947	+1.27%
Source: INSEE

== See also ==
- Communes of the Pas-de-Calais department
- The Battle of Fromelles
