= Fromelles (Pheasant Wood) Military Cemetery =

WWI CWGC cemetery in Nord Department, France

- Commonwealth War Graves Commission
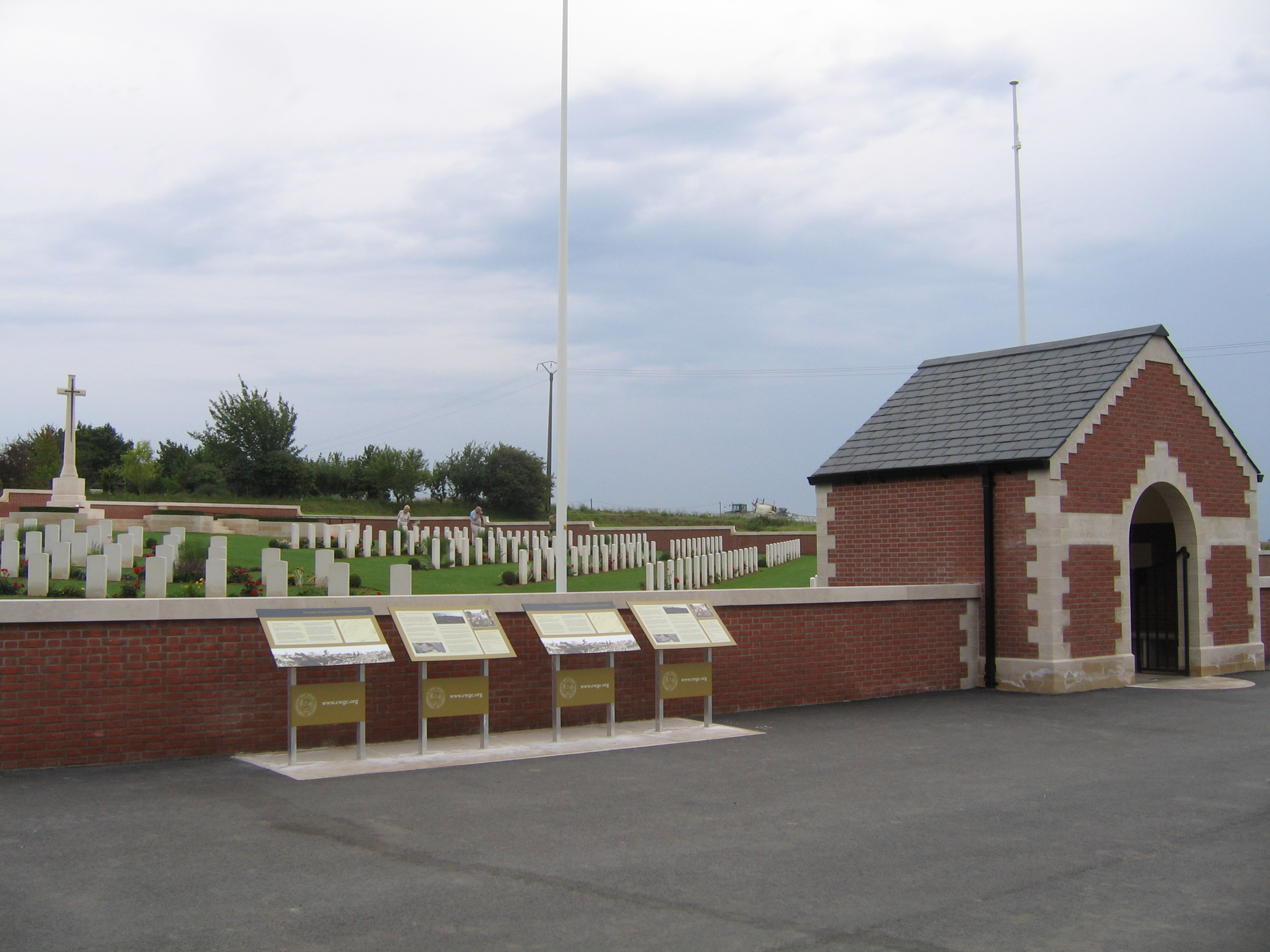
- Fromelles (Pheasant Wood) Military Cemetery
- Used for those deceased 19–20 July 1916; Battle of Fromelles
- Established: 30 January 2010
- Unveiled: 19 July 2010
- Location: 50°36′28″N 02°51′5″E near Fromelles
- Designed by: Barry Edwards
- Total burials: 250

Burials by nation
- * United Kingdom, 3: Australia, 205 (96 identified by name); Unknown, 43

Burials by war
- First World War

UNESCO World Heritage Site
- Official name: Funerary and memory sites of the First World War (Western Front)
- Type: Cultural
- Criteria: i, ii, vi
- Designated: 2023 (45th session)
- Reference no.: 1567-ND01

Fromelles (Pheasant Wood) Military Cemetery is a First World War cemetery built by the Commonwealth War Graves Commission on the outskirts of Fromelles in northern France, near the Belgian border. Constructed between 2009 and 2010, it was the first new Commonwealth War Graves Commission cemetery for more than 50 years, the last such cemeteries having been built after World War II. The cemetery contains the graves of 250 British and Australian soldiers who died on 19 July 1916 in the Battle of Fromelles.

The bodies were discovered following historical research that included analysis of aerial photographs showing the presence of mass graves on the edge of Pheasant Wood (Bois Faisan), just outside the village of Fromelles. The presence of the bodies was confirmed in May 2008, and the bodies were recovered during excavation work in 2009. A specially convened Identification Board published a report on 17 March 2010 announcing the first 75 bodies to have been successfully identified using DNA analysis. Further identification continued until at least 2014.

In parallel with the recovery and identification projects, the Commonwealth War Graves Commission was asked by the British and Australian governments to construct a new cemetery to house the bodies. Building work on the cemetery began in May 2009, and the main structural elements were completed by January 2010. The dead soldiers were reburied with full military honours in a series of funeral services in January and February 2010. The ceremonial first reburial took place on 30 January 2010.

Following this period of reburials, topsoil was added to the cemetery, and the horticultural elements planted and allowed to grow into place. One final reburial took place as part of the cemetery's dedication ceremony, which was held on 19 July 2010 to mark the 94th anniversary of the Battle of Fromelles.

== Background ==
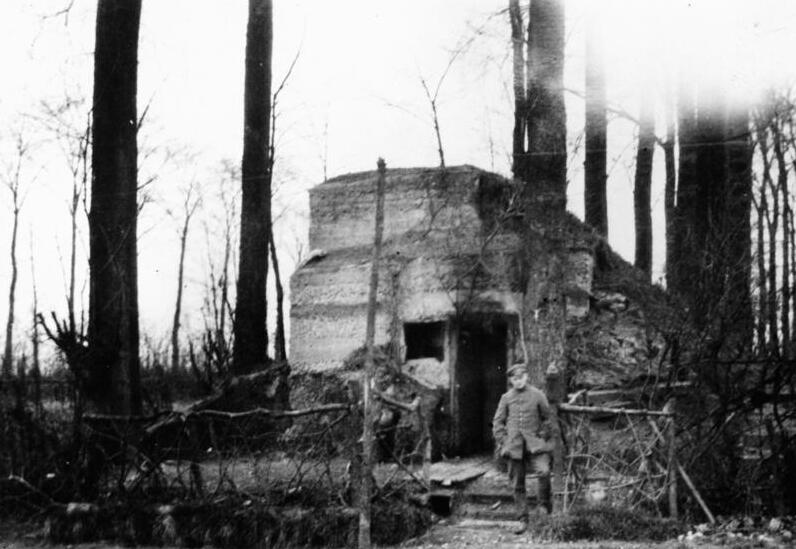
Having sustained major attacks in 1915 at the battles of Neuve Chapelle and Aubers Ridge, German troops around Fromelles were heavily dug in by 1916, not only in trenches but also in bunkers such as this one and in fortified farm buildings.

The Battle of Fromelles took place on the night of 19–20 July 1916, during the Somme Offensive of the Western Front in World War I. It was a diversionary battle, intended to draw the attention of the Germans away from the larger attacks elsewhere. It involved units of the Australian 5th Division and the British 61st Division attacking German positions in and around Fromelles. The German positions were well defended, and the battle led to huge losses by the attacking forces, with particularly heavy losses incurred by the Australian 15th Brigade and British 184th Brigade. This was the first major battle on the Western Front involving the First Australian Imperial Force (AIF), and has been described as "the worst 24 hours in Australia's entire history."

Records kept by the Commonwealth War Graves Commission show that 1,780 Australian soldiers and 503 British soldiers died in the battle, but many of these bodies were not recovered. These missing dead are commemorated not by individual graves and names on headstones, but by names carved on memorials dedicated for that purpose. The Australian missing dead from the battle are inscribed on the memorial at the V.C. Corner Australian Cemetery and Memorial, and over 400 unidentified bodies from the battle are also buried there. Many of the dead were recovered by German forces after the battle and buried behind German lines. Some of these burial sites were located in the years immediately following the First World War, and the bodies were reburied in cemeteries in the area, including the V.C. Corner Cemetery.

== Discovery of mass graves ==
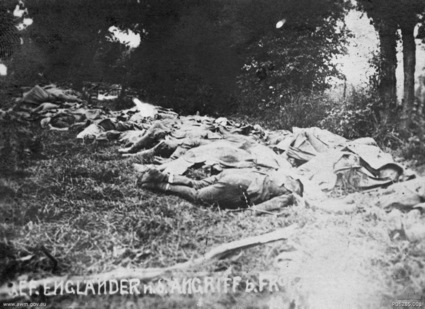
A German propaganda postcard showing dead "English" soldiers (according to the German caption) arranged in a wooded area near Fromelles just after the battle of 19–20 July 1916. The Australian War Memorial notes that many of the soldiers are already covered with groundsheets: eyelets from groundsheets (used to lower the bodies into the deep graves) were recovered from the Pheasant Wood site.

The burial pits at Pheasant Wood remained undisturbed for over 90 years. Their existence was discovered following research by retired Australian teacher Lambis Englezos. Following a visit to Fromelles in 2002, Englezos calculated a discrepancy in the numbers of unidentified Fromelles burials when compared to the lists of the missing. Following up on this, he investigated the possibility that the missing bodies had been buried in unmarked mass graves by the Germans, and never recovered since. In May 2006, 60 Minutes reporter Ray Martin and producer Stephen Rice began an investigation of Englezos's theories and visited Fromelles to examine his evidence. In July 2006 they broadcast a report supporting his findings and demanding action by the Federal Government. Several years of historical research, including examination of aerial photographs, Red Cross records, and German war records, led to the convening of an Army History Unit in Australia, and submissions to the All-Party Parliamentary War Graves and Battlefield Heritage Group in the UK. The evidence eventually became strong enough that an official investigation was ordered.

An archaeological evaluation of the suspected burial sites was carried out in May 2008 by the Glasgow University Archaeological Research Division (GUARD). This limited survey and excavation confirmed that the sites contained the bodies of British and Australian soldiers from the First World War, and this led to the funding of a larger project to fully excavate the site. The main excavation was carried out by Oxford Archaeology from May to September 2009, and resulted in the recovery of 250 British and Australian bodies from five mass graves, and some 6,200 individual artefacts. Appeals have been made for relatives of soldiers known to have died in the battle to come forward, and DNA analysis by LGC Forensics is being carried out in an attempt to identify the bodies.

== Planning ==
Following the discovery of the mass graves at Pheasant Wood in May 2008, the British and Australian governments set up a jointly funded body, the Fromelles Management Board (FMB), to achieve three main aims: to recover, identify, and re-inter the bodies. The FMB would co-ordinate between multiple French, British and Australian organisations, and provide overall supervision for the project. Although the British and Australian governments, through the FMB, retained overall responsibility, the Commonwealth War Graves Commission (CWGC) was asked to act as their agent and provide day-to-day project management, with the Fromelles Project Manager, provided by the CWGC, also being a member of the Board.

In addition to providing management for the project, the CWGC was asked to construct a new cemetery for the reburial of the bodies that would be recovered. Although asked to do this by the British and Australian governments, the design, construction and maintenance of such cemeteries is part of the central remit of the CWGC, and as such the estimated 900,000 euros construction cost was covered by funding from CWGC member countries. The funding for the excavations, DNA analysis, and reburial ceremonies, was shared equally by the British and Australian governments.

The plans and designs for the new cemetery were drawn up by the commission's architect, Barry Edwards. One of the immediate problems faced was deciding on a suitable location. The original location of the mass graves was considered as a site for the cemetery (and was offered as such by the landowner), but the ground was found to be too prone to flooding. The site that was chosen was nearby, about 120 metres to the southwest of the original battlefield mass graves, but on a higher piece of land just outside the village of Fromelles. The overall cemetery shape is hexagonal, and the design incorporated radial rows of headstones leading towards a raised Cross of Sacrifice on the southern side of the cemetery. This higher location for the cemetery allowed the deliberate placement of the Cross of Sacrifice at a place where it would be visible on the skyline when viewed from the nearby V.C. Corner Australian Cemetery and Memorial. This memorial is one of several locations in and around Fromelles where those who fell in the battle are commemorated. The Fromelles battlefield of 1916 would also be visible from the elevated Cross of Sacrifice terrace. Another consideration in the design was the cemetery orientation, with the headstones orientated to the south to avoid shadows and to increase the daytime visibility of the headstone inscriptions. The exact layout of the burial plots was left flexible as the number of burials needed was not known at that point. A small car park was included in the design. Unlike earlier CWGC cemeteries, this modern cemetery was designed to include ramps to allow accessibility for wheelchair users.

The CWGC plans for the new cemetery were made public in April 2009 and announced by the commission's Director-General, Richard Kellaway, who stated a desire that the cemetery would be worthy of the sacrifices made by those who would be buried there, and that it would become "a place of dignified pilgrimage and remembrance for generations to come."

In September 2009, a report was published by the Fromelles Management Board ('Fromelles – the story so far'). Written by the Board co-Chairs from the UK Ministry of Defence and the Australian Defence Force, the report stated that the object of the project is "the dignified recovery of the remains of those soldiers who have lain in the field at Pheasant Wood for the last 93 years so as to provide them the same courtesies that were extended to their colleagues when the battlefields were cleared at the end of the War – an individual burial with military honours and their name on their headstone where ever possible."

== Construction ==
The cemetery construction contract was awarded to Beton-Bouw Bentein BVBA. This company, which was founded in 1921, helped to rebuild Flanders after the war, and had previous experience working with the commission. Before construction could begin, the area had to be checked by the French authorities for ordnance and other materiel left from the war. This was done in April 2009, and though no unexploded munitions were found, other wartime debris was cleared from the area, including barbed wire and shell cases. Construction proper began in May 2009, with the site being levelled in preparation for the laying of the foundations, while temporary hoardings were put up to enclose the site.

Although access to the main construction and excavation sites was restricted by this point, there was still great interest shown, with visits both by the media, and by schoolchildren and relatives of those who had died at Fromelles. Information was displayed at the site on display boards, and commemorative plaques were also installed. Artworks on the theme of 'Remembrance', drawn and painted by schoolchildren from the UK, France and Australia, were installed on aluminium panels on the hoardings. The artwork from the UK came from the Year 7 schoolchildren from Stonyhurst St Mary's Hall, Lancashire, and in June 2009, they travelled to Fromelles to visit the site and see their artwork on display.

The geology of the site, a former farmer's field on a slight slope, with a heavy clay soil that is subject to seasonal movements when wet, meant that substantial foundations and drainage had to be constructed. The main support for the above ground structures consists of 210 concrete piles extending vertically downwards into the soil, each up to 7 metres deep. These pilings were engineered in June 2009 by a specialist company, Wig-Palen, from Belgium, using a 62-ton machine to drill and compact the required holes. Concrete was then poured into the hollow drill to fill the void as the drill was extracted, and steel reinforcement cages were then placed into the still-wet concrete. This screw-piling technique ensured that the cemetery foundations were both end-bearing and friction-bearing in nature, increasing the stability of the pilings and the structures they support.

By July 2009, work was being done on carving the headstones. A supply of the traditional Portland stone (Broadcroft Whitbed) was reserved, and blank headstones shaped and shipped to France. Carving of the headstones was done using the commission's computer-controlled Incisograph system. Also that month, planning and cultivation had started for the plants to be used in the new cemetery. Many months would be needed to develop and prune the plants in pots so they would be ready to transplant in the Spring of 2010, in preparation for the opening ceremony that July. The limited time between the planned reburials in February 2010, and the opening of the cemetery, meant that the grassed areas would need to be turfed, instead of growing the grass from seeds. The roses used are the 'Remembrance' cultivar, one often used in Commission cemeteries.

In August 2009, work began on the construction of the cemetery boundary walls. Horizontal reinforced-concrete beams, laid down below ground, provided a foundation for the stepped boundary walls, built using brick. Like all the foundations laid here, the concrete beams were encased in a polystyrene casing to allow for expansion and contraction of the soil. Heavy rain during August delayed the construction work, but in September and October, a period of fine dry weather allowed progress to be made on the most complex part of the project, the Cross of Sacrifice and its terrace and foundations.

The size of the Cross of Sacrifice, a standard Commission structure used for cemeteries with over 40 graves, varies according to the number of burials in a cemetery. For this cemetery, a Type-A Cross, around 4 metres wide at the base and 6 metres high, would be used. Carved from Massangies, a French limestone, the shaft of the cross alone would weigh four tonnes, while the entire raised stone terrace would weigh many more tonnes. To support the weight of the Cross and the raised terrace on which it would stand, special foundations of twenty-six vertical 7-metre deep concrete piles were prepared, each capable of supporting ten tonnes, four of which would support the Cross itself. A connecting network was also built between the piles to ensure the load was spread evenly. The raised terrace includes ramps to allow access by wheelchair, and bastions for flower displays.

The system of underground piles and beams that has been constructed not only supports the cemetery walls and the Cross of Sacrifice terrace, but also supports the graves and headstones as well. Each headstone is installed in an individual base, which is supported by horizontal ground beams, which rests on the vertical piles. All this is needed to isolate the cemetery structures from ground movements.

Carving of the Cross of Sacrifice started in October 2009, and the same month the stonework for the terrace and the base of the cross was laid, and excavations took place to prepare the burial plots. Several feet of soil were removed across much of the cemetery area and replaced with limestone aggregate and gravel. These materials drain more easily than the clay soil, and provide a solid surface for the burial parties to stand on. The actual burials involved the coffins being lowered into wooden sarcophagi that were installed at this point in the construction process. Following the February 2010 burials, the headstones were installed, and the limestone and gravel layer covered with topsoil and turfed with grass. Finally, the plants were added and allowed to bed in prior to the dedication ceremony in July.

== Burials ==
Following their recovery, the remains of the 250 British and Australian soldiers were stored in temporary mortuary facilities. Since any possible identification would take many months, it was decided to carry out the reburials as soon as the cemetery was ready, and use temporary headstones. Following the report of the Identification Board, in March 2010, permanent headstones were installed. The headstones include any names and nationalities that it has been possible to ascertain using historical, anthropological, archaeological and DNA evidence, but where the identity is unknown the carved inscription on the headstone will simply read "Known Unto God", the standard phrase used for the headstones of unknown soldiers.

The inaugural reburial and ceremony took place at 11 am local time on 30 January 2010, with around 400 people watching from the viewing areas outside the cemetery walls. The cemetery grounds were covered with a light dusting of snow. Orders of service were available in English and French, and the ceremony was attended by representatives from Australia, France, the UK and the Commonwealth War Graves Commission, all of whom paid tribute to the fallen. Representing the UK government was Kevan Jones, the Veterans Minister. Representing Australia was Alan Griffin, the Minister for Veterans' Affairs, while from the French military was the former Chief of Defence of the French Army, Bruno Cuche. In his speech, General Cuche paid tribute to the sacrifice made by the young soldiers that fought in the battle:

When we give these soldiers a dignified grave we accomplish here one of the oldest gestures of mankind. It is a gesture of devotion. It is the gesture accomplished by every son for his father and by every nation for their heroes. Let them rest in peace in this land for which they shed their blood and which owes them everything, including freedom!

— General Bruno Cuche, 30 January 2010

The gun salute was fired by soldiers from the Royal Regiment of Fusiliers and the Australian Army. A guard of honour was formed by forty French veterans, each carrying a flag representing a town or village in the Lille area, with the flag for Fromelles itself dating from 1914. The pallbearers were from the Royal Regiment of Fusiliers, and standard bearers from the Royal British Legion were also present.

Following the ceremony, a reception was hosted by the Mayor, Hubert Huchette, and the people of Fromelles.

The remainder of the reburials, with the exception of one reserved for the dedication ceremony in July, took place in February 2010. The reburials, starting on 1 February, took place on Mondays, Wednesdays and Fridays, starting at 9 am, with up to thirty soldiers being re-interred each day, all with full military honours. There is a viewing area from which the military funerals can be observed, and an area to leave tributes. In addition, there were public displays at Fromelles Town Hall (Mairie) and at the recovery location, and a Book of Remembrance is available to sign.

Each day of reburials opened with a parade where a ceremonial guard oversaw the raising of the Union (British), Australian and French flags. Following a blessing by the military chaplains, the flags were lowered to half-staff, and the reburials began. Each funeral followed the same standard pattern used for the inaugural reburial, but were carried out in pairs to reflect the joint British-Australian nature of the battle. A bearer party conveyed each coffin from a hearse to the designated burial plot, and the chaplain conducted the funeral service. At the end of the day, the chaplain said a prayer, military collects were read out by Australian and British soldiers, and a soldier recited the Exhortation from the Ode of Remembrance ("They shall grow not old ... We will remember them"). Following this, a firing party fired three volleys, a trumpeter sounded the Last Post, and a one-minute silence was held. The silence was broken by the trumpeter sounding Reveille, the chaplain then read a final blessing, the flags were raised back to full-staff and then re-lowered and removed, and the parade marched off.

Care has been taken over the allocation of the burial plots, with the position of each body in the mass graves recorded to ensure that the soldiers who lay side by side at Pheasant Wood for ninety-three years will be buried in adjacent plots in their final resting place.

== Identifications ==
Identifications of the 250 men reinterred in the cemetery were first announced by the Australians and British on 17 March 2010. Of these, 75 Australians were identified by name, 128 men were found to be Australian, three were British, and 44 remain unidentified. An identity board was held in May 2010 and further boards annually until 2014. On 7 May 2010 Australian news sources reported that a further 19 Australian soldiers had been identified, with The Age stating that no further British casualties had been identified. Two identifications were announced on 7 July 2010, one being Lieutenant-Colonel Ignatius Bertram Norris, who commanded 53rd Battalion in the attack on 19 July 1916. Ninety-six Australians have been named and of the remaining 154 men, 109 are known to be Australian, three are British and 42 remain unidentified.

== Dedication ==
The opening and dedication of Fromelles (Pheasant Wood) Military Cemetery took place on Monday 19 July 2010, to mark the 94th anniversary of the Battle of Fromelles. This commemorative event centred around the re-burial of the final set of remains. In attendance were Prince Charles and Camilla, Duchess of Cornwall; the Governor-General of Australia, Quentin Bryce; the Duke of Kent, president of the CWGC; senior military figures, including General Sir David Richards, the British Chief of the General Staff, Lieutenant General Ken Gillespie, the Australian Chief of Army, and General Elrick Irastorza, Chief of Staff of the French Army; government representatives including Lord Astor for the British Ministry of Defence and Hubert Falco for the French Minister of Defence representatives of the families of identified soldiers; as well as other dignitaries from Australia, France and the UK, and those who have worked on the project.

A restored First World War general service wagon, drawn by horses from the King's Troop, Royal Horse Artillery transported the coffin from the original mass grave site at Pheasant Wood, through the streets of Fromelles, to the new cemetery. It was escorted by British and Australian soldiers. The coffin was then carried into the cemetery by a bearer party of soldiers from the Royal Regiment of Fusiliers, and Australia's Federation Guard. The dedication service then took place, which included relatives of those killed at Fromelles reading extracts from letters and diaries from the First World War. The coffin was then lowered into the grave, and a joint British-Australian firing party fired three volleys. This was followed by a minute's silence, and then laying of wreaths by Prince Charles, Quentin Bryce and the government ministers.

== Visitor Centre ==
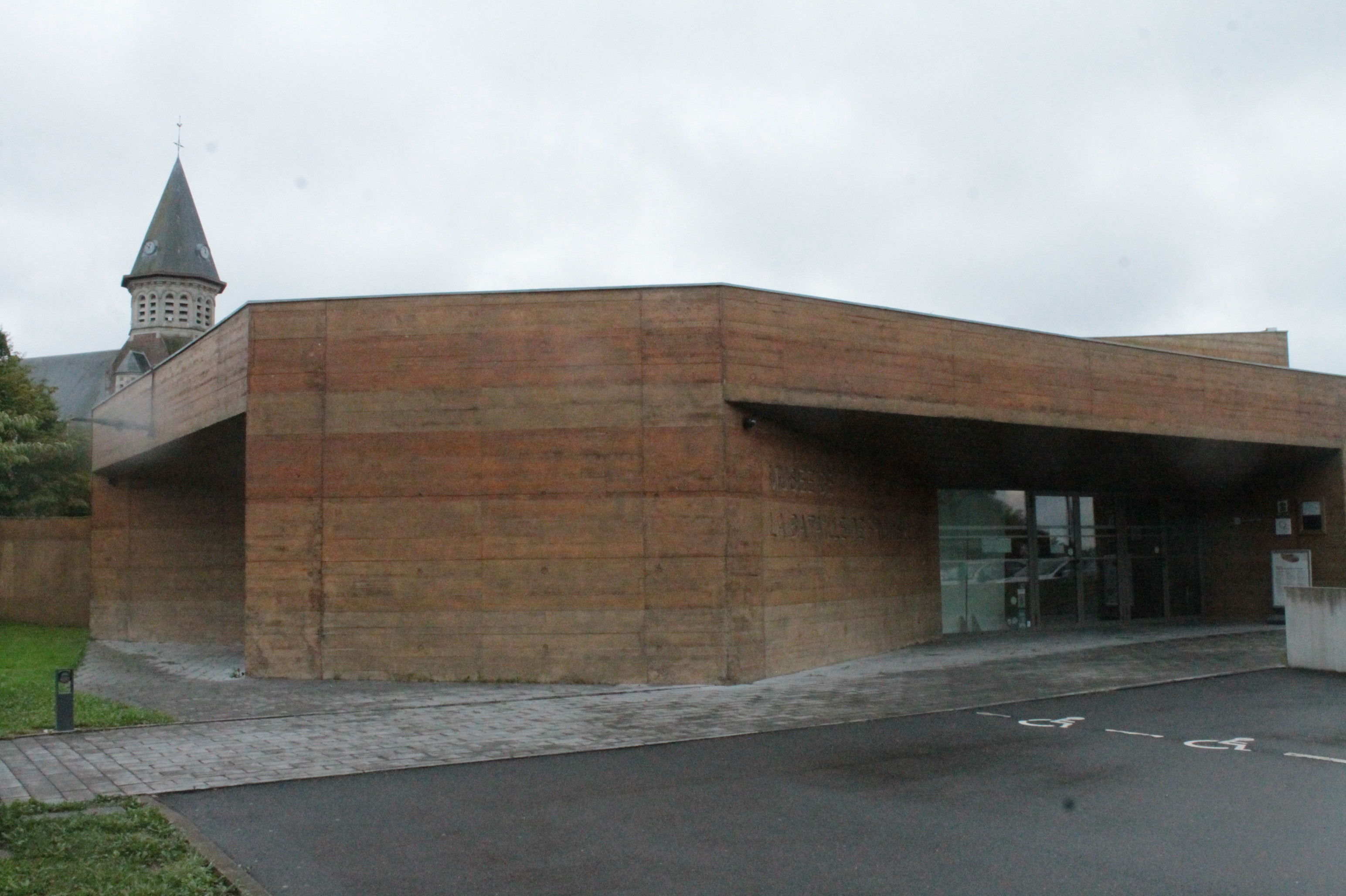
Visitor Centre and Museum to the Battle of Fromelles

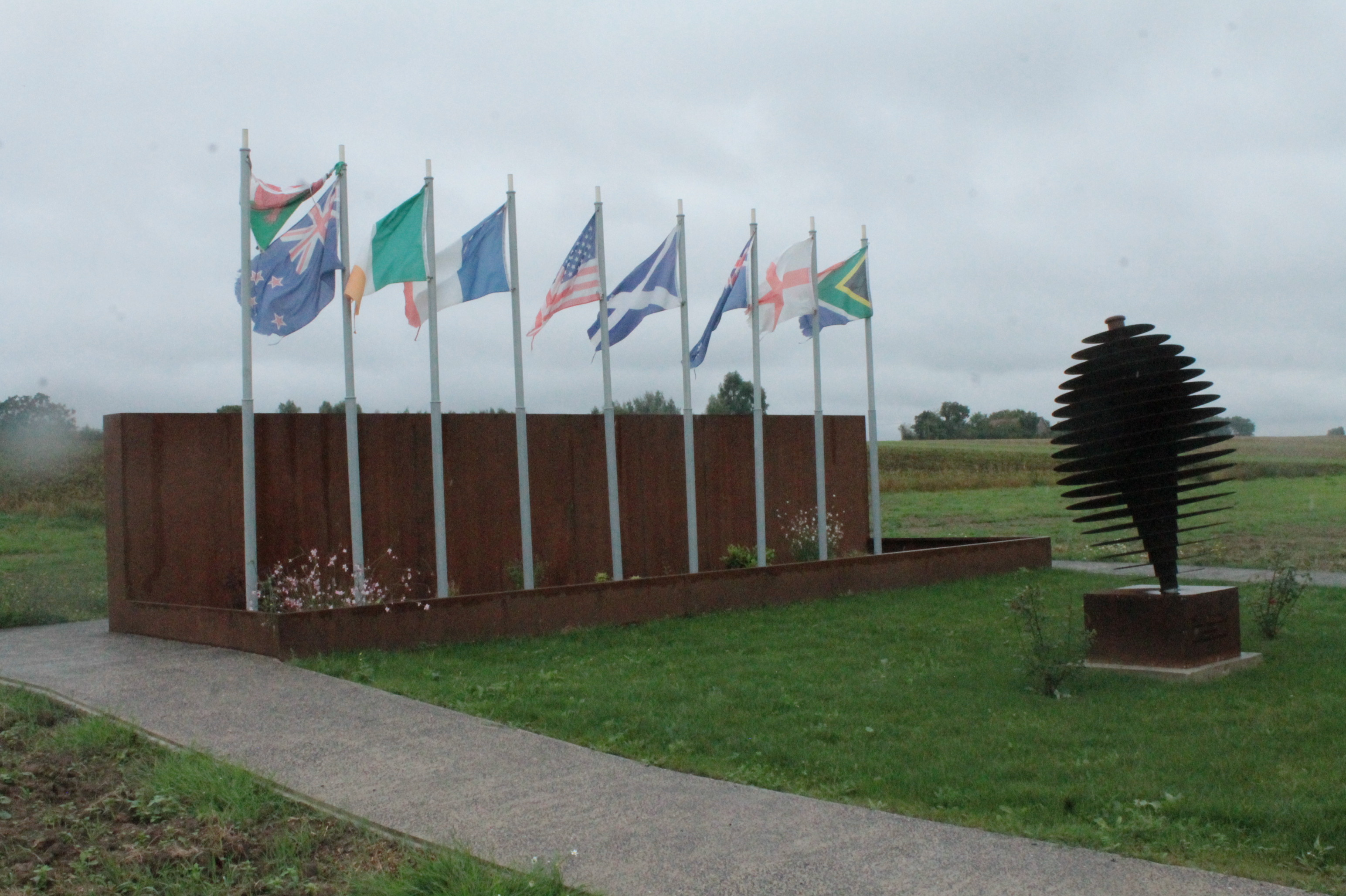
Memorial to the 133 rugby players killed in the Great War, at Fromelles

In July 2014 a museum/ visitor centre was opened immediately east of the cemetery dedicated to the Battle of Fromelles and the casualties in the cemetery. This contains many small artefacts and some reconstructions of life in the trenches together with personal information of many of the victims.

== Rugby Players Memorial ==
A further memorial was added on the west side of the cemetery dedicated to the 133 rugby players who lost their lives in the Great War. Notably Herbert Bolt is buried in the cemetery.
