= Alec Campbell =

Australian soldier (1899–2002)

- Born: Alexander William Campbell; 26 February 1899; Launceston, Colony of Tasmania, British Empire
- Died: 16 May 2002 (aged 103); Hobart, Tasmania, Australia
- Relatives: Ruby Rose (great-granddaughter)
- Military career
- Allegiance: Australia
- Branch: Australian Army; Australian Imperial Force (AIF), 15th Battalion, 4th Infantry Brigade
- Service years: 1915 – 1916
- Rank: Private
- Nickname: The Kid
- Conflicts: World War I; Battle of Gallipoli
- Awards: 1914–15 Star, British War Medal, Victory Medal, 80th Anniversary Armistice Remembrance Medal, Centenary Medal
- Other work: Jackeroo, carpenter, mechanic, builder, boxer (Tasmanian Flyweight Champion), sailor (six Sydney to Hobart Yacht Races) and unionist

Alexander William Campbell (26 February 1899 – 16 May 2002) was the final surviving Australian participant of the Gallipoli campaign during the First World War. Campbell joined the Australian Army at the age of 16 in 1915, and served as a stores carrier for two months during the fighting at Gallipoli. He was invalided home and discharged in 1916. He later worked in a large number of roles, was twice married and had nine children. He is the great-grandfather of actress, singer, and model Ruby Rose.

== Biography ==
Alec Campbell was born in Launceston, Colony of Tasmania, British Empire, the son of Marian Isobel (Thrower) and Samuel Alexander Campbell. He studied at Scotch College, Launceston, and then worked as a clerk with the Colonial Mutual Fire Insurance Company. At the age of 16 he left his job to enlist in the army. Not having his father's permission, he lied about his age, claiming to be two years older to enlist without parental consent. He joined the 15th Battalion of the Australian Imperial Force in July 1915. Not even being old enough to shave, Campbell gained the nickname "The Kid" during his training in Hobart. One of his cousins had died already at Gallipoli, and the idea of Campbell's deployment terrified his parents. His unit embarked from Melbourne aboard HMAT Kyarra on 21 August 1915, and Campbell landed at Anzac Cove in early November 1915. He assisted in carrying ammunition, stores and water to the trenches. He received a minor wound in the fighting at Gallipoli; when evacuated with the rest of the Australian forces in 1916, he became ill with a fever which caused partial facial paralysis. He was subsequently invalided home aboard HMAT Port Sydney on 24 June 1916, and was formally discharged on 22 August 1916—a Gallipoli veteran at only 17. He only fought in the war for two months; he later explained tersely,

"I joined for adventure. There was not a great feeling of defending the Empire. I lived through it, somehow. I enjoyed some of it. I am not a philosopher. Gallipoli was Gallipoli."

=== Civilian life ===
Campbell had a crowded life. In South Australia, New South Wales and Tasmania, he was variously a jackaroo, carpenter, railway carriage builder, mature-age university student, public servant, research officer and historian. He received vocational training in motor-body building at the Hobart Repatriation Trade School. He was a union organiser in the Launceston and Hobart railway workshops and an organiser with the Amalgamated Society of Carpenters and Joiners of Australia (now part of the Construction, Forestry, Mining and Energy Union (CFMEU)). He became president of the Tasmanian branch of the Australian Railways Union between 1939 and 1941, and president of the Launceston Trades and Labor Council between 1939 and 1942. He also worked on the construction of (Old) Parliament House in Canberra.

After the Second World War, Campbell completed an economics degree at the age of 50. He worked with the Department of Labour and National Service.

A lover of sailing, he became an accomplished boat-builder, and competed in seven Sydney to Hobart yacht races. In 1950, he circumnavigated Tasmania aboard the Kintail.

Campbell married twice - both wives were named Kathleen - and he fathered nine children, the last one being born when he was sixty-nine.

He led an uncommonly vigorous life. Only in his final few months did he need to use a wheelchair. In the end, a chest infection led to a deteriorating condition, and the 103-year-old war veteran died peacefully on 16 May 2002. He is buried at the Cornelian Bay Cemetery in Hobart.

His second wife, who survived him, observed:

"Alec has become national property, although I'm not sure he realises it."

He was survived by thirty grandchildren, thirty-two great-grandchildren (which includes model/actress Ruby Rose) and two great-great-grandchildren, as of 2000. As of 2022, he has nine great-great-grandchildren.

=== Australian "legend" ===
In 2000, Campbell was recognised as one of the "Australian Legends". His name and photograph were honoured as part of an annual series of commemorative postage stamps issued by Australia Post since 1997. The stamps commemorate living Australians "who have made lifetime contributions to the development of Australia's national identity and character". Campbell lived to fully enjoy this honour.

Campbell's 45-cent Legend stamp displays the soldier's portrait as a young man, photographed just prior to his departure for Gallipoli. Formal photographs of the other two Anzac centenarians complete this stamp set. In addition, a fourth stamp features the 1914–15 star medal which was presented to all those who fought in campaigns during those war years. These stamps, designed by Cathleen Cram of the Australia Post Design Studio, commemorate the story of events and people shaping contemporary Australia. The Campbell stamp honours him as an individual and as a representative of all 68,000 soldiers at Gallipoli whose actions affected Australia's evolving self-image.

In one of his last public appearances, Campbell led the 2002 Anzac Day Parade in Hobart. As he sat in his car before the parade, he especially seemed to enjoy shaking hands with the dozens of young children who came up to greet him.

Campbell's birth in 1899 was just shortly before the Commonwealth of Australia came into being. At his death, the nation honoured him with a Commonwealth-sponsored state funeral at Saint David's Anglican Cathedral in Hobart on 24 May 2002.

In the context of Campbell's death, then Australian Prime Minister John Howard observed that Campbell was the last living link to that group of Australians that established the Anzac legend. Howard also acknowledged that Gallipoli was "a story of great valour under fire, unity of purpose and a willingness to fight against the odds" and that Campbell "was the last known person anywhere in the world who served in that extraordinarily tragic campaign." Campbell never understood the intense public attention on his later life and his longevity, and was unhappy at times that he was lauded by conservative politicians who ignored his later union activity. After his death he received many tributes, including from Tasmanian Returned and Services League (RSL) State President Ian Kennett, who said that Mr Alec William Campbell was a great Australian and that he "led a full and happy life and put his energies, upon returning to Hobart, back into his career and family".

At some point between 1996 and 2002, as the ranks of Anzac survivors thinned and Campbell's own health failed, his name rose to prominence. According to Rowan Cahill, writing for the Australian Rail Tram and Bus Industry Union, assertive nationalist and martial forces sought to turn Campbell into an icon as "the last of the Anzacs." Campbell resisted the myth-making. He observed that there was nothing really extraordinary in being the last; rather, he pointed out the simple fact that he had been one of the youngest at Gallipoli. Shortly before his death, Campbell stated that "For god's sake, don't glorify Gallipoli - it was a terrible fiasco, a total failure and best forgotten".

== Medals and honours ==
- 1914-15 Star
- British War Medal
- Victory Medal
- 80th Anniversary Armistice Remembrance Medal (21 April 1999)
- Australia Post Australian Legends Award (2000)
- Centenary Medal (1 January 2002)

== See also ==
- Roy Longmore, one of the last two surviving veterans of Gallipoli.
- Walter Parker, one of the last three surviving veterans of Gallipoli.
