= Peter Casserly =

Australian soldier

- Born: 28 January 1898; Gingin, Western Australia
- Died: 24 June 2005 (aged 107); Perth, Western Australia
- Military career
- Allegiance: Australia
- Branch: Australian Imperial Force
- Service years: 1917–1919
- Rank: Private
- Unit: 2nd Light Railway Company No 5 Section

Peter Casserly (28 January 1898 – 24 June 2005) was, at age 107, the last surviving member of the 1st AIF serving in France in the First World War. At the time of his death, he was believed to be the oldest living Australian man, and his marriage to Monica Delgado was also believed to be Australia's longest.

== Early years 1898–1917 ==
Casserly was born in Gingin, Western Australia. His father, who was born in Australia, but of Irish descent, had moved to Western Australia in search of gold; but ended up working for the railways and on the wharves, barely earning enough to put food on the table for his eleven children.

Casserly attended the Christian Brothers College in Perth until he left school at thirteen to become a blacksmith's apprentice, and was working at the blacksmith's when World War I broke out. In 1917, he was working as a fireman for the West Australian Railways when he saw a recruiting advert by the Australian army for experienced railwaymen to serve in France, and he enlisted on Saint Patrick's Day.

== World War I service 1917–1919 ==
Casserly was sent to a training camp in Melbourne before leaving for France. When his troop carrier, the Ascanius, was moored off Fremantle, he was refused permission to say goodbye to his mother, so he sent her a message in a bottle, which was found and sent to her.

On arrival in France, he was sent to the Somme, where he served as an armed guard with the 2nd Transport Unit. The trains to and from the battlefront were subject to frequent bombardment from the Germans. Casserly served with the 2nd, 5th and 16th Railway Transport Units in Belgium and France. He also served as a sapper supporting Australian and British forces fighting in Ypres, Armentières and Amiens. Peter had many stories, one story in particular when a German shell came down and in through the roof of the locomotive grazing his ear and lodged into the floor of the locomotive.

Casserly was court-martialled on 18 May 1918 on a charge of "When on active service, using violence to his superior officer in that he 'in the field' on 5 May 1918 violently assaulted Sgt A.G. Riddie". He was found guilty of the charge and was sentenced to 12 months 'IHL' ('In Hard Labour'). He was admitted to No. 1 Military Prison in France on 5 June 1918. On 15 October 1918, the remainder of his sentence was suspended, and he rejoined his unit.

After the ceasefire, Casserly was involved in cleaning up until his discharge on 11 September 1919. After the war he made a decision never to serve in the armed forces again. He only attended two Anzac Day marches in his life – in 1917 and in 2004 when he was driven as the guest of honour.

== 1919–2005 ==
After the war, Casserly returned to Fremantle where he worked as a wharf labourer, timber worker, seaman, and fisherman. He started his own timber yard, then established a cray fishing service. Casserly won a Royal Humane Society bravery award for saving a man from drowning.

In 1923, Casserly married Filipino-born Monica Delgado. The couple had two sons, Eddie and Peter Jr. The couple were married for eighty years until Monica's death in 2004. The marriage is believed to be Australia's longest nuptial union. The couple lived for many years in the White Gum Valley near Perth in a home that Casserly built himself. After they both became centenarians, the couple moved into the Craigville Gardens in Melville, Western Australia.

He was awarded the 80th Anniversary Armistice Remembrance Medal in 1999, and was part of a contingent of surviving veterans to tour the Western Front in 1993. Although fifty Australian servicemen received the Légion d'honneur, Casserly did not because of the previously mentioned court-martial. John Howard presented him with a Centenary Medal in 2001 in honour of the one-hundredth anniversary of Australian Federation.

Casserly died in Perth on 24 June 2005. He was survived by his son, Peter, seven grandchildren, fourteen great-grandchildren and four great-great-grandchildren.

When asked about the secret to a long life, he replied: "Keep on breathing, I suppose."

== Honours and awards ==

- British War Medal
- Victory Medal
- 80th Anniversary Armistice Remembrance Medal (awarded 21 April 1999)
- Centenary Medal (awarded 1 January 2002)
