= William Evan Allan =

Australian centenarian

- Born: 24 June 1899; Bega, New South Wales
- Died: 18 October 2005 (aged 106); Essendon, Victoria
- Military career
- Allegiance: Australia
- Branch: Royal Australian Navy
- Service years: 1914–1947
- Rank: Lieutenant
- Conflicts: First World War; Asian and Pacific theatre; Second World War; Battle of the Atlantic; South West Pacific theatre

William Evan Crawford Allan (24 July 1899 – 18 October 2005) was, at the age of 106, one of Australia's last living veterans of the First World War, and the last remaining Australian who saw active service in both world wars. Allan was a career sailor in the Royal Australian Navy (RAN), serving from 1914 to 1947.

== Early life ==
Allan was born in Bega in the then British colony of New South Wales, eighteen months before the Commonwealth of Australia came into being.

== Naval career ==
He joined the RAN in March 1914 at the age of fourteen as a boy, second class. When war was declared on 14 August 1914, he was 15 and serving aboard the training ship HMAS Tingira, which was docked in Rose Bay, Sydney. He served on board HMAS Encounter until the end of the war, and became an able seaman in 1915. When he was eighteen, he survived the Spanish flu pandemic, which killed over fifty of his shipmates on a transport voyage between Cape Town and Sierra Leone.

Between the world wars, Allan was rescued by his captain after falling overboard in the North Atlantic during a storm. In 1932, he was promoted to chief petty officer.

Allan went on to serve on HMS Moreton Bay and HMAS Ladava in the Second World War. He retired from the Navy on 30 October 1947, after serving thirty-four years, being granted his war service rank of lieutenant in 1948.

He met his wife, Ida Gwendoline Wright, while his ship was docked in Vancouver, British Columbia, Canada, in 1924, and he continued to write to her until his ship returned to Vancouver in 1941. They married on that return trip and sailed to Australia as newlyweds on SS Mariposa, via Hawaii – only twelve days before the Japanese attacked Pearl Harbor. After his retirement, they lived at Somerville on the Mornington Peninsula in Victoria, where he farmed.

== Later life ==
Allan was awarded the 80th Anniversary Armistice Remembrance Medal by the Government of Australia in 1999, and lived in the Melbourne suburb of Essendon, Victoria, until his death at the age of 106. He was given a state funeral at HMAS Cerberus on the Mornington Peninsula, Victoria.

== Honours and awards ==

- King George V Silver Jubilee Medal
- King George VI Coronation Medal
- 80th Anniversary Armistice Remembrance Medal (awarded 21 April 1999)
- Centenary Medal (awarded 1 January 2002)
