= Gilbert Bennion =

Australian veteran (1898–2005)

- Born: 1 October 1898; Croydon, North Queensland
- Died: 27 January 2005 (aged 106)
- Occupations: Officer in the Citizens Military Force; Last stationmaster at Tweed Heads station
- Known for: He was the last remaining New South Wales Australian veteran of World War I when he died at the age of 106.
- Notable work: He was honored with the 80th Anniversary Armistice Remembrance Medal in 2000 and the Centenary Medal in 2002.

Gilbert Bennion (1 October 1898 – 27 January 2005) was, at age 106, one of the last surviving Australian veterans of World War I.

== Biography ==
Born in Croydon, North Queensland, he was an apprentice railway station master in Townsville when he enlisted on 1 August 1918 to serve in the Australian Imperial Force. He trained at Enoggera, was promoted to corporal, and was discharged without serving overseas. Not having been to Croydon in six years, he visited home to bid farewell to his parents, but by the time his stay was over two or three days later, the boat carrying his unit had sailed for New Zealand.

In peacetime, Bennion was an officer in the Citizens Military Force. He also rejoined Queensland Rail and was the last stationmaster at Tweed Heads station.

== Honours ==
Bennion received the 80th Anniversary Armistice Remembrance Medal in 2000, and the Centenary Medal in 2002.

== Death ==
Bennion was the last remaining New South Wales Australian veteran of World War I, and died at the age of 106 on January 27, 2005.
