= Walter Parker =

Walter Parker may refer to:

- Walter Richard Parker (1881–1931), English infantryman, recipient of the Victoria Cross
- Walter Parker (Australian soldier) (1894–2000), Australian centenarian, one of the last three living ANZAC veterans of World War I
- Walter B. Parker (1926–2014), American policy and transportation official in Alaska
