= Roy Longmore =

Australian soldier (1894–2001)

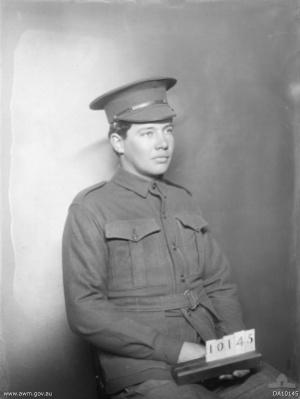
- Private Roy Longmore c.1915
- Born: 29 April 1894; Bannockburn, Victoria
- Died: 21 June 2001 (aged 107); Burwood, Victoria
- Military career
- Allegiance: Australia
- Branch: Australian Army; Australian Imperial Force (AIF), 3rd Reinforcements, 21st Battalion; 2nd Pioneer Battalion
- Service years: 13 July 1915 – 16 March 1919
- Rank: Lance Sergeant (LSgt)
- Conflicts: World War I; Battle of Gallipoli; Western Front; Battle of Pozières; Battle of Armentières; Battle of Villers-Bretonneux
- Awards: 1914–15 Star; British War Medal; Victory Medal; 80th Anniversary Armistice Remembrance Medal; Centenary Medal; Légion d'honneur (France)
- Other work: Farmhand, Taxicab driver

Roy Longmore (29 April 1894 – 21 June 2001) was an Australian soldier and centenarian, who after Alec Campbell, was noted as the second last living Australian and New Zealand Army Corps (ANZAC) veteran who saw service in World War I.

== ANZAC soldier ==
Longmore set aside his life as a farm-hand in Geelong, Victoria, when he enlisted in the Australian Army with the branch of the Australian Imperial Force at age 21. Private (Pte) Roy Longmore, 3rd Reinforcements, 21st Battalion, of Bannockburn, Victoria enlisted on 13 July 1915, and embarked from Melbourne aboard HMAT Anchises on 26 August 1915. After training in Egypt, was sent to the Battle of Gallipoli where he was a sapper with the 2nd Division, burrowing underneath the Turkish positions and laying mines. After evacuation from Turkey, he fought at Pozières, Armentières, and Villers-Bretonneux. He was wounded three times in France and was momentarily given up for dead when he was shot as the Armistice approached in November 1918. He later recalled,

"We were patrolling in a gully when suddenly half a dozen Germans appeared over a hill armed with machine guns and opened fire. Jerry riddled me, knocking me flat on my back, and the last I heard was 'Longy's had it, they got him.'"

Fortunately, his fellow soldiers saw him move and rescued him. Lance Sergeant (LSgt) and returned to Australia on 16 March 1919 as a member of the 2nd Pioneer Battalion.

== Civilian life ==
After returning to Australia in 1919, his injuries made returning to farm work impossible, so he drove a taxi in Melbourne. Another change caused by the war was more telling. Before, he had hunted rabbits; but he later explained that when he returned home, he no longer had an appetite for firing at anything alive.

Longmore married and had one son, Eric. The one-time LSgt Longmore died peacefully in his sleep at a Burwood Nursing Home aged 107 on 21 June 2001. He was the second last Anzac to die. At his death, Australia honored him one final time with a state funeral.

== Australian "legend" ==
In 2000, Longmore along with fellow ANZAC veterans Alec Campbell and Walter Parker was recognized as an "Australian Legends." His name and photograph were honored as part of an annual series of commemorative postage stamps issued by Australia Post since 1997. The stamps commemorate living Australians "who have made lifetime contributions to the development of Australia's national identity and character". Longmore lived to fully enjoy this honor.

Longmore's 45-cent Legend stamp displays the soldier's portrait as a young man, photographed just prior to his departure for Gallipoli. Formal photographs of the other two ANZAC centenarians complete this stamp set, titled The Last ANZACs. In addition, a fourth stamp features the 1914-15 star medal which was presented to all those who fought in campaigns during those war years. These stamps, designed by Cathleen Cram of the Australia Post Design Studio, commemorate the story of events and people shaping contemporary Australia. The Longmore stamp honors him as an individual and as a representative of all 68,000 soldiers at Gallipoli whose actions affected Australia's evolving self-image.

== Medals and honours ==

- 1914–15 Star
- British War Medal
- Victory Medal (UK)
- 80th Anniversary Armistice Remembrance Medal, 1999 (Australia).
- Centenary Medal (Australia)
- Légion d'honneur, 1998 (France).
- Australia Post Australian Legends Award, 2000.

== See also ==
- Alec Campbell, last living Anzac
- Walter Parker, one of the last three living Anzacs to have served at Gallipoli
