= Anzac Day =

National day of remembrance

ANZAC Day
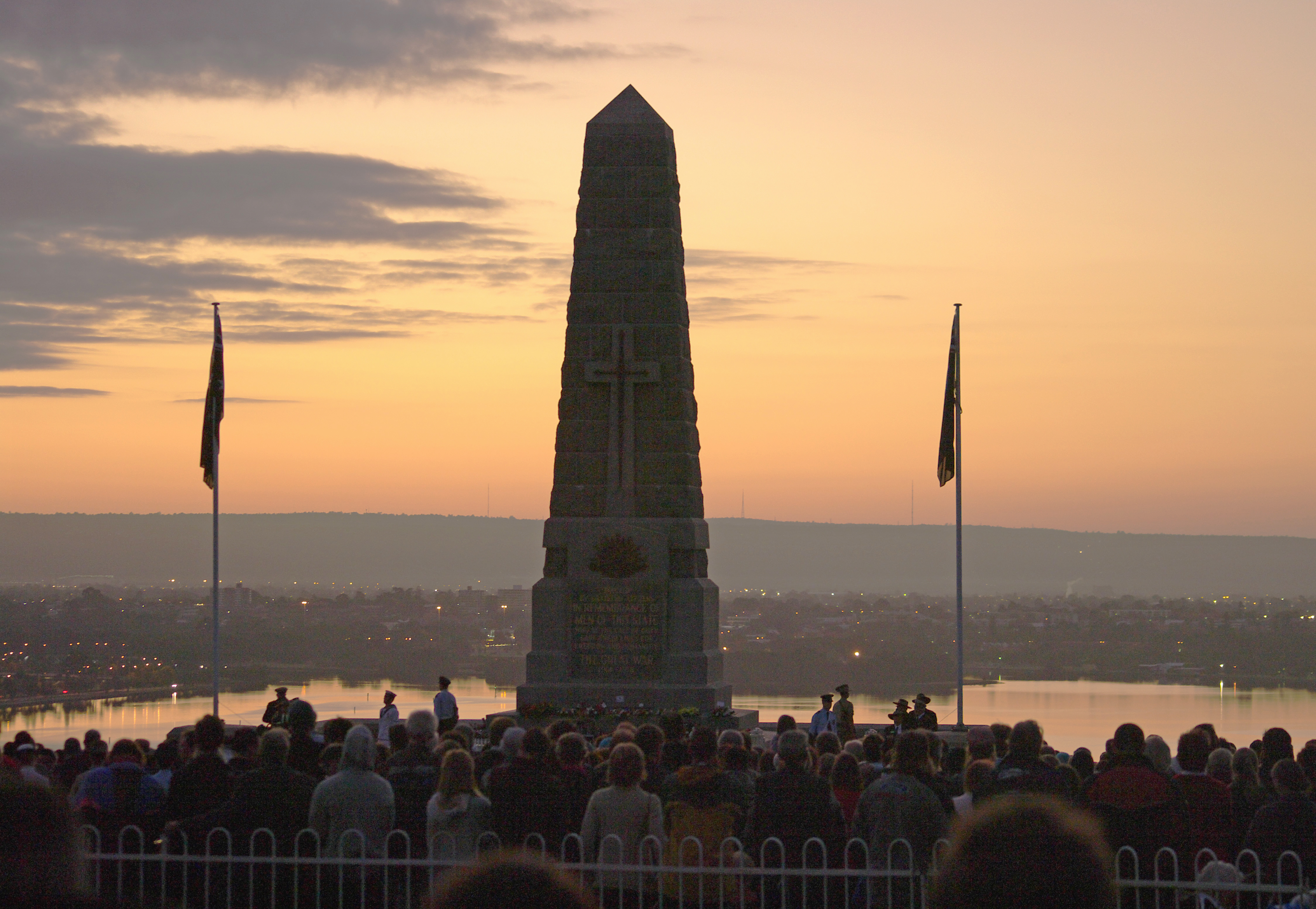
- ANZAC Day Dawn Service at Kings Park, Western Australia, 25 April 2009, 94th anniversary.
- Also called: Māori: Rā o Ngā Hōia
- Observed by: as public holiday: Australia; New Zealand; Cook Islands; Niue; Tonga; observations: Turkey; United Kingdom; Commonwealth of Nations
- Type: Commemorative, patriotic, historic
- Significance: National day of remembrance and first landing of the Anzacs at Gallipoli
- Observances: Dawn services, commemorative marches, remembrance services
- Date: 25 April
- Frequency: Annual
- Related to: Remembrance Day

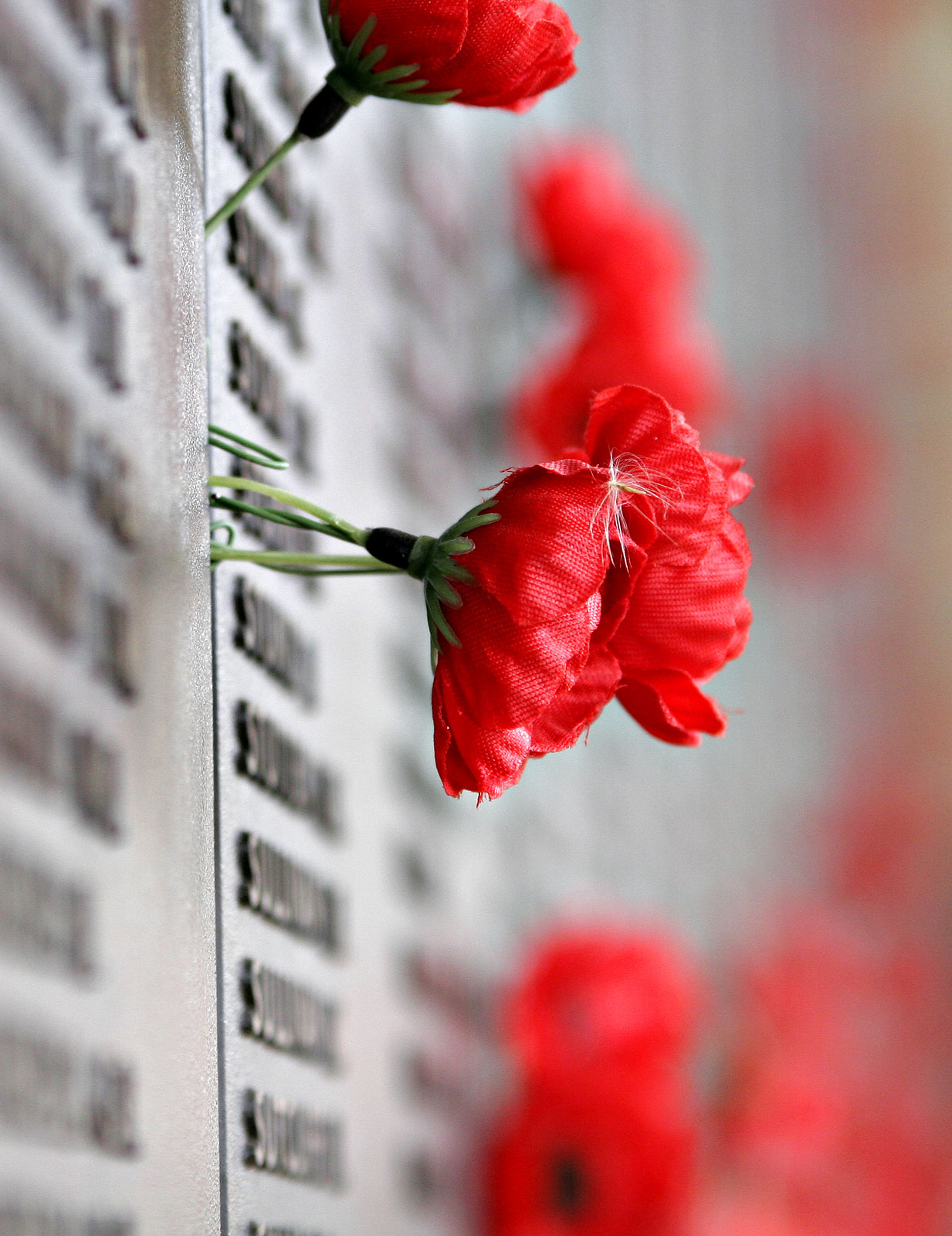
The remembrance poppy is an artificial flower that has been used since 1921 to commemorate war dead.

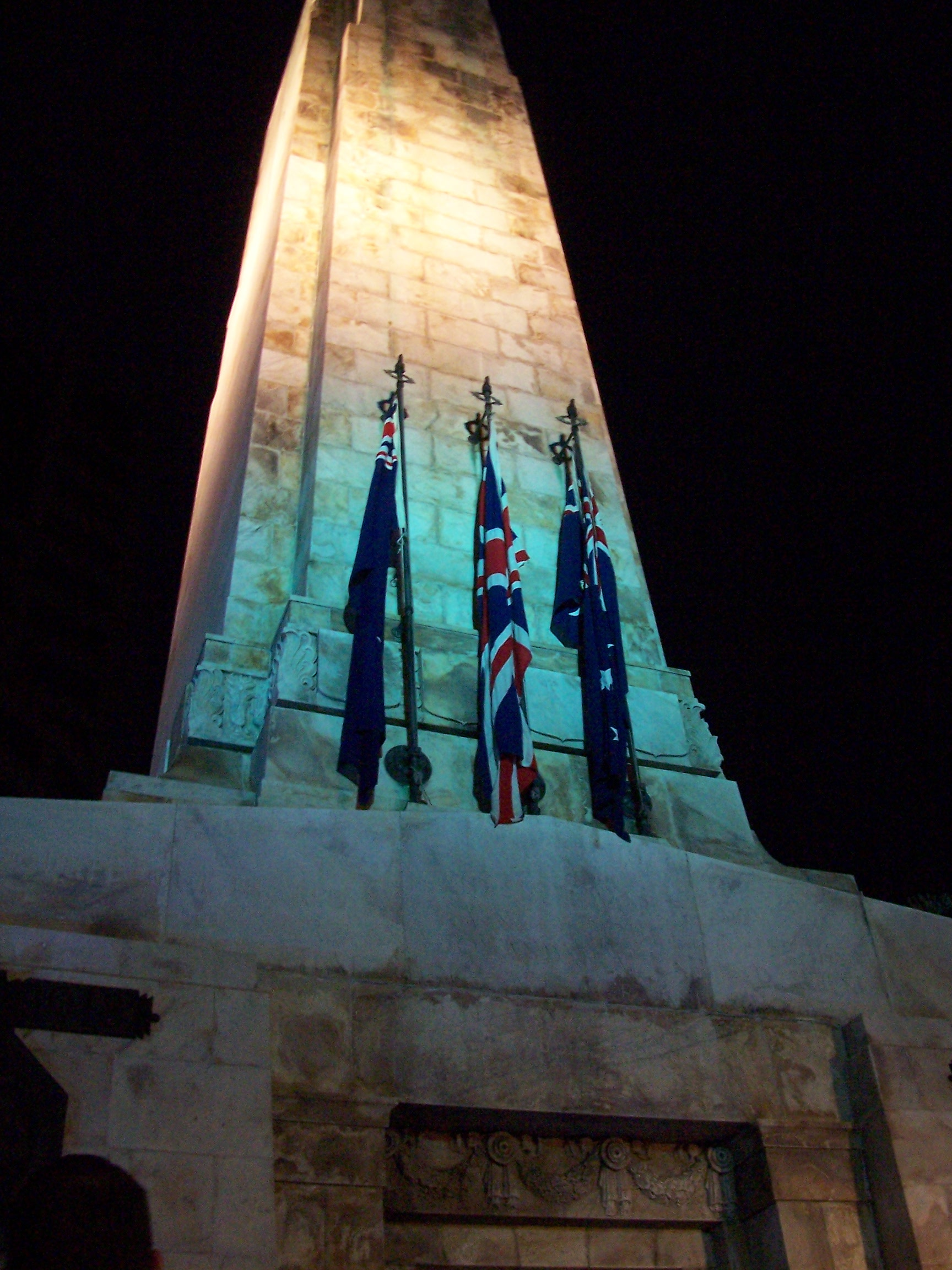
Flags on the cenotaph in Wellington for the 2007 Dawn March. From left to right, the flags of New Zealand, the United Kingdom and Australia.

Anzac Day (Note: /ˈænzæk/; Māori: Rā Whakamahara ki ngā Hōia o Ahitereiria me Aotearoa, lit. 'Australian and New Zealand Veterans Remembrance Day' or Rā o ngā Hōia, 'Soldiers' Day') (Note: Also capitalised ANZAC Day) is a national day of remembrance in Australia and New Zealand that broadly commemorates all Australians and New Zealanders "who served and died in all wars, conflicts, and peacekeeping operations" and "the contribution and suffering of all those who have served". Observed on 25 April each year, Anzac Day was originally devised to honour the members of the Australian and New Zealand Army Corps (ANZAC) who served in the Gallipoli campaign, their first engagement in the First World War (1914–1918).

== History ==
Anzac Day marks the anniversary of the first campaign that led to major casualties for Australian and New Zealand forces during the First World War. The acronym ANZAC stands for Australian and New Zealand Army Corps, whose soldiers were known as Anzacs. Anzac Day remains one of the most important national occasions of both Australia and New Zealand; however, the ceremonies and their meanings have changed significantly since 1915. According to Martin Crotty, a historian at the University of Queensland, Anzac commemorations have "suited political purposes right from 1916 when the first Anzac Day march was held in London and Australia, which were very much around trying to get more people to sign up to the war in 1916–1918".

=== Gallipoli campaign, 1915 ===
In 1915, Australian and New Zealand soldiers formed part of an Allied expedition that set out to capture the Gallipoli Peninsula in the Ottoman Empire to open the way to the Black Sea for the Allied navies. The objective was to capture Constantinople, the capital of the Ottoman Empire, which was a member of the Central Powers during the war. The ANZAC force landed at Gallipoli on 25 April, meeting fierce resistance from the Ottoman Army commanded by Mustafa Kemal (later known as Atatürk). What had been planned as a bold strike to knock the Ottomans out of the war quickly became a stalemate, and the campaign dragged on for eight months. At the end of 1915, the Allied forces were evacuated after both sides had suffered heavy casualties and endured great hardships. The Allied deaths totalled over 56,000, including 8,709 from Australia and 2,721 from New Zealand. News of the landing at Gallipoli made a profound impact on Australians and New Zealanders at home and 25 April quickly became the day on which they remembered the sacrifice of those who had died in the war.

Though the Gallipoli campaign failed to achieve its military objectives of capturing Constantinople and knocking the Ottoman Empire out of the war, the actions of the Australian and New Zealand troops during the campaign bequeathed an intangible but powerful legacy. The creation of what became known as an Anzac legend became an important part of the national identity in both countries. This has shaped the way their citizens have viewed both their past and their understanding of the present. The heroism of the soldiers in the failed Gallipoli campaign made their sacrifices iconic in New Zealand memory, and is often credited with securing the psychological independence of the nation.

=== From 1915 to World War II ===
On 30 April 1915, when the first news of the landing reached New Zealand, a half-day holiday was declared and impromptu services were held.

Adelaide was the site of Australia's first built memorial to the Gallipoli landing, unveiled by Governor-General Sir Ronald Munro Ferguson on Wattle Day, 7 September 1915, just over four months after the first landings. The monument was originally the centrepiece of the Wattle Day League's Gallipoli Memorial Wattle Grove on Sir Lewis Cohen Avenue in the South Park Lands. The original native pines and remnant seedlings of the original wattles still grow in Wattle Grove, but in 1940 the Adelaide City Council moved the monument and its surrounding pergola a short distance away to Lundie Gardens. Also in South Australia, Eight Hour Day, 13 October 1915, was renamed Anzac Day and a carnival was organised to raise money for the Wounded Soldiers Fund. The name Anzac Day was chosen through a competition, won by Robert Wheeler, a draper of Prospect.

Melbourne observed an Anzac Remembrance Day on 17 December 1915.

Anniversary commemorations started in Queensland. On 10 January 1916, Canon David John Garland was appointed the honorary secretary of the Anzac Day Commemoration Committee of Queensland (ADCCQ) at a public meeting which endorsed 25 April as the date to be promoted as "Anzac Day" in 1916 and ever after. Queensland Premier T. J. Ryan urged the other Australian states to enact a similar parade, and soon the date became a national day of reflection. Devoted to the cause of a non-denominational commemoration that could be attended by the whole of Australian society, Garland worked amicably across all denominational divides, creating the framework for Anzac Day commemorative services. Garland is specifically credited with initiating the Anzac Day march, the wreath-laying ceremonies at memorials and the special church services, the two minutes of silence, and the luncheon for returned soldiers. Garland intended the silence to be used in lieu of a prayer to allow the Anzac Day service to be universally attended, allowing attendees to make a silent prayer or remembrance in accordance with their own beliefs. He particularly feared that the universality of the ceremony would fall victim to religious sectarian disputes. The State Library of Queensland holds the minutes from the Anzac Day Commemoration Committee of Queensland; the collection has been digitised and available to view online. In 2019, the collection was added to UNESCO's Memory of the World Australian Register.

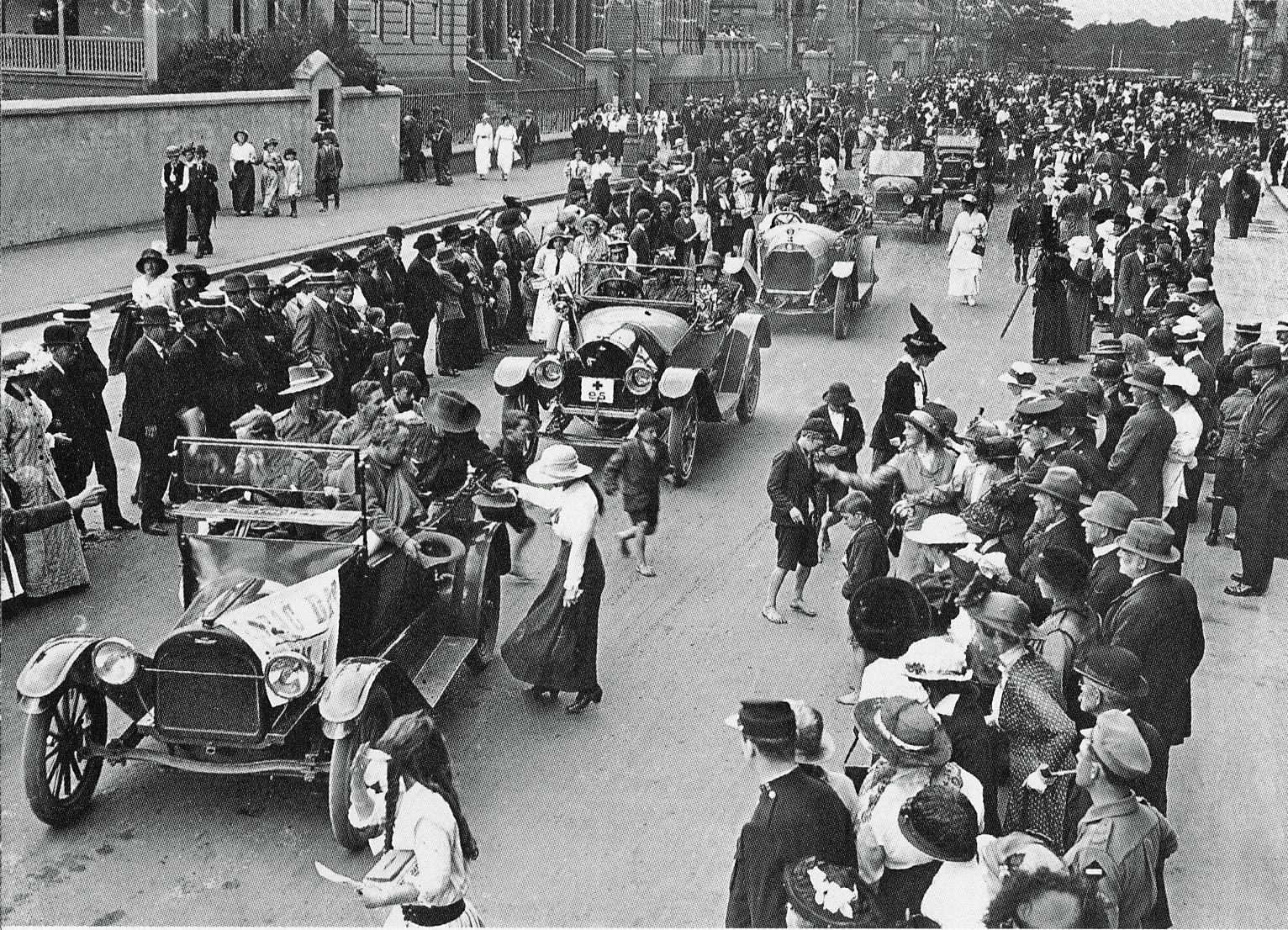
First Anzac Day parade in Sydney, along Macquarie Street, 25 April 1916

The date 25 April was officially named Anzac Day in 1916; in that year, it was marked by a wide variety of ceremonies and services in Australia, New Zealand and London. In New Zealand, it was gazetted as a half-day holiday. Over 2,000 people attended the service in Rotorua. In London, over 2,000 Australian and New Zealand troops marched through the streets of the city. An unnamed London newspaper reputedly dubbed them "The Knights of Gallipoli". Marches were held all over Australia; wounded soldiers from Gallipoli attended the Sydney march in convoys of cars, accompanied by nurses.

In Egypt, General John Monash paraded the troops on Anzac Day 1916.

For the remaining years of the war, Anzac Day was used as an occasion for patriotic rallies and recruiting campaigns, and marches of serving members of the AIF were held in most cities. From 1916 onwards, in both Australia and New Zealand, Anzac memorials were held on or about 25 April, mainly organised by returned servicemen and school children in cooperation with local authorities. Early morning services were solemn, with a more upbeat tone set for honouring returned soldiers during afternoon activities.

Australian troops did not return to great victory parades at the end of the war. This was partly because their arrival home depended on available shipping, but also because of the influenza epidemic of 1919, which prevented people assembling in large numbers. The 1919 Sydney parade was cancelled as a result, but a public commemorative service was held in the Domain, where participants were required to wear masks and stand three feet apart.

Anzac Day was gazetted as a public holiday in New Zealand in 1920, through the Anzac Day Act, after lobbying by the New Zealand Returned Services' Association, the RSA.

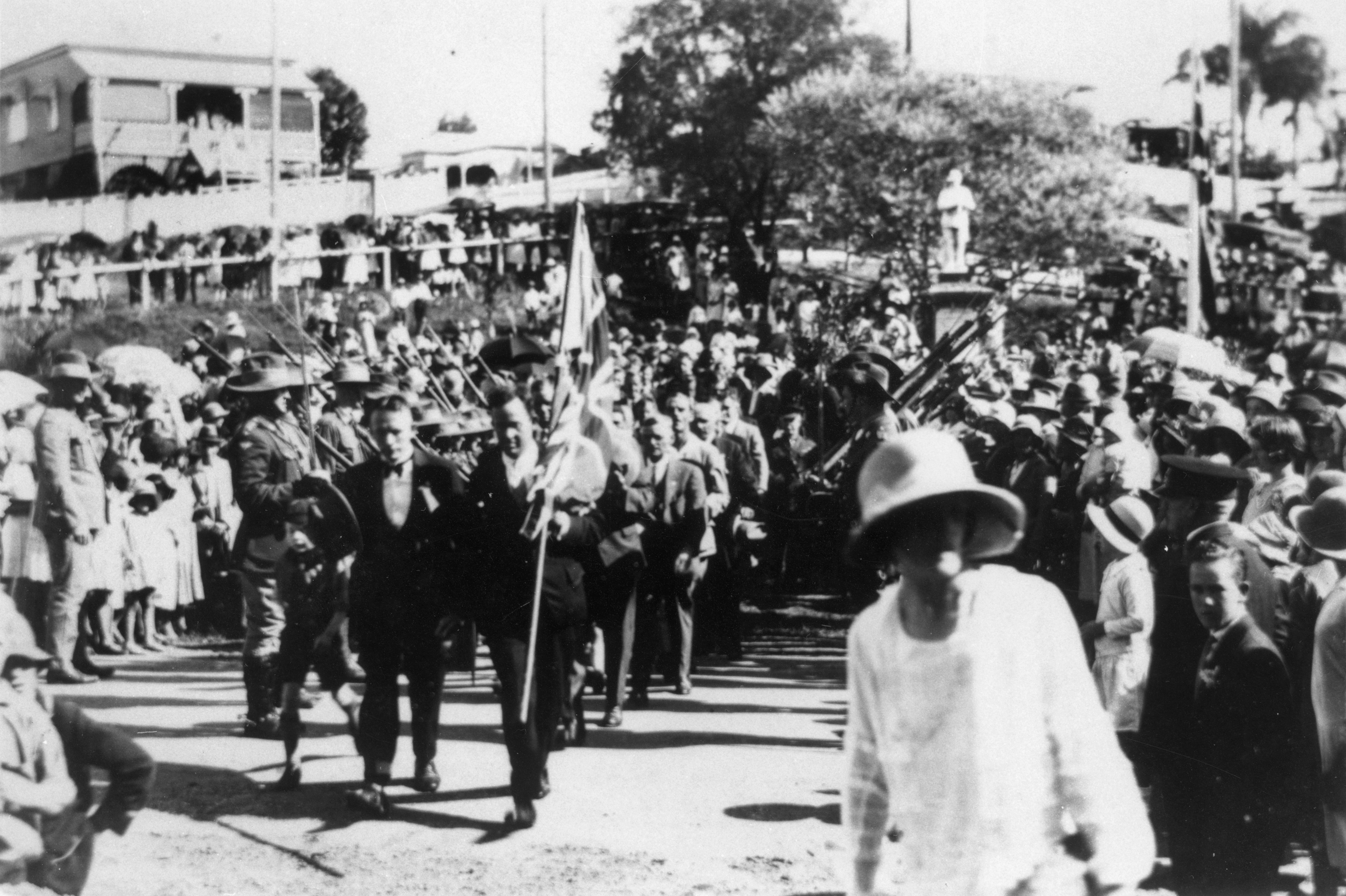
Anzac Day at Manly, Queensland, 1922

In Australia at the 1921 State Premiers' Conference, it was decided that Anzac Day would be observed on 25 April each year. However, it was not observed uniformly in all the states until 1922 when the States were invited to co-operate with the Commonwealth in observing the day, and an invitation was telegraphed to the various religious bodies suggesting that memorial services be held in the morning. In the early 1920s returned soldiers mostly commemorated Anzac Day informally, primarily as a means of keeping in contact with each other. But as time passed and they inevitably began to drift apart, the ex-soldiers perceived a need for an institutionalised reunion. During the late 1920s, Anzac Day became established as a National Day of Commemoration for the 60,000 Australians and 18,000 New Zealanders who died during the war. The first year in which all the Australian states observed some form of public holiday together on Anzac Day was 1927. By the mid-1930s, all the rituals now associated with the day – dawn vigils, marches, memorial services, reunions, two-up games – became part of Australian Anzac Day culture. New Zealand commemorations also adopted many of these rituals, with the dawn service being introduced from Australia in 1939.

=== Changes after World War II ===
With the coming of the Second World War, Anzac Day became a day on which to commemorate the lives of Australians and New Zealanders which were lost in that war as well and in subsequent wars. The meaning of the day has been further broadened to include those killed in all the military operations in which the countries have been involved. Anzac Day was first commemorated at the Australian War Memorial in 1942, but, due to government orders preventing large public gatherings in case of Japanese air attack, it was a small affair and was neither a march nor a memorial service. Anzac Day has been annually commemorated at the Australian War Memorial ever since. In New Zealand, Anzac Day saw a surge in popularity immediately after World War II.

=== Decline in popularity ===
By the 1950s, many New Zealanders had become antagonistic or indifferent towards the day. Much of this was linked to the legal ban on commerce on Anzac Day, and the banning by many local authorities of sports events and other entertainment on the day. Annoyance was particularly pronounced in 1953 and 1959, when Anzac Day fell on a Saturday. There was widespread public debate on the issue, with some people calling for the public holiday to be moved to the nearest Sunday or abolished altogether. In 1966, a new Anzac Day Act was passed, allowing sport and entertainment in the afternoon.

During and after Australia's involvement in the Vietnam War (1962–1975), interest in Anzac Day reached its lowest point in Australia. On 26 April 1975, The Australian newspaper covered the passing of Anzac Day in a single story. In the 1960s and 1970s, anti-war protesters used Anzac Day events as a platform to voice opposition to conscription and Australia's military involvement in general; in the following 20 years, the relevance of Australia's war connection with the British Empire was brought into question. In 1967, two members of the left-wing Progressive Youth Movement in Christchurch staged a minor protest at the Anzac Day ceremony, laying a wreath protesting against the Vietnam War. They were subsequently convicted of disorderly conduct. In 1978, a women's group laid a wreath dedicated to all the women raped and killed during war, and movements for feminism, gay rights, and peace used the occasion to draw attention to their respective causes at various times during the 1980s. In 1981, the group Women Against Rape in War marched up Anzac Parade towards the Australian War Memorial to lay their wreath at the Stone of Remembrance. At the head of the procession, women held a banner which read, "In memory of all women of all countries raped in all wars." More than 60 women were arrested by police. Following this time, there were calls for a new type of comradeship that did not discriminate based on sex or race.

=== 1990s–2010s: Revival ===
In 1990, to mark the 75th anniversary of the Gallipoli landing, many of the last surviving Gallipoli veterans along with government officials from Australia and New Zealand, including Australian Prime Minister Bob Hawke and New Zealand governor-general Paul Reeves, travelled to Turkey for a special Dawn Service at Gallipoli.

Bob Hawke was the first Australian Prime Minister to visit Turkey to pay respect to the fallen. Prime Minister John Howard was also a huge proponent of Anzac Day commemorations, and visited Gallipoli on 25 April in both 2000 and 2005.

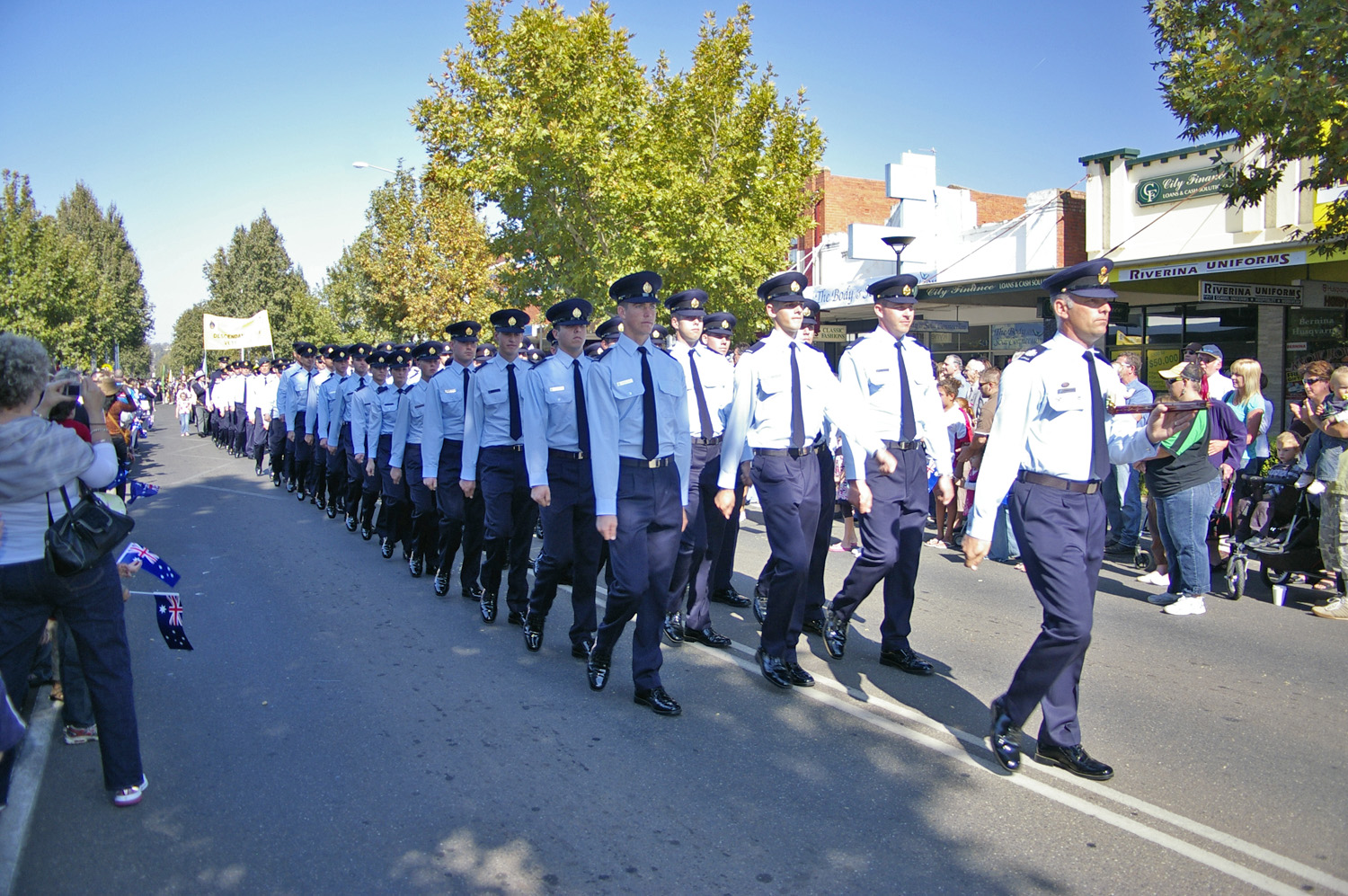
A large commemoration march in Wagga Wagga, New South Wales (April 2008)

An increasing number of attendees have been young Australians, many of whom attend ceremonies swathed in Australian flags, wearing green-and-gold T-shirts and beanies and with Australian flag tattoos imprinted on their skin. This phenomenon has been perceived by some as a reflection of the desire of younger generations of Australians to honour the sacrifices made by the previous generations.

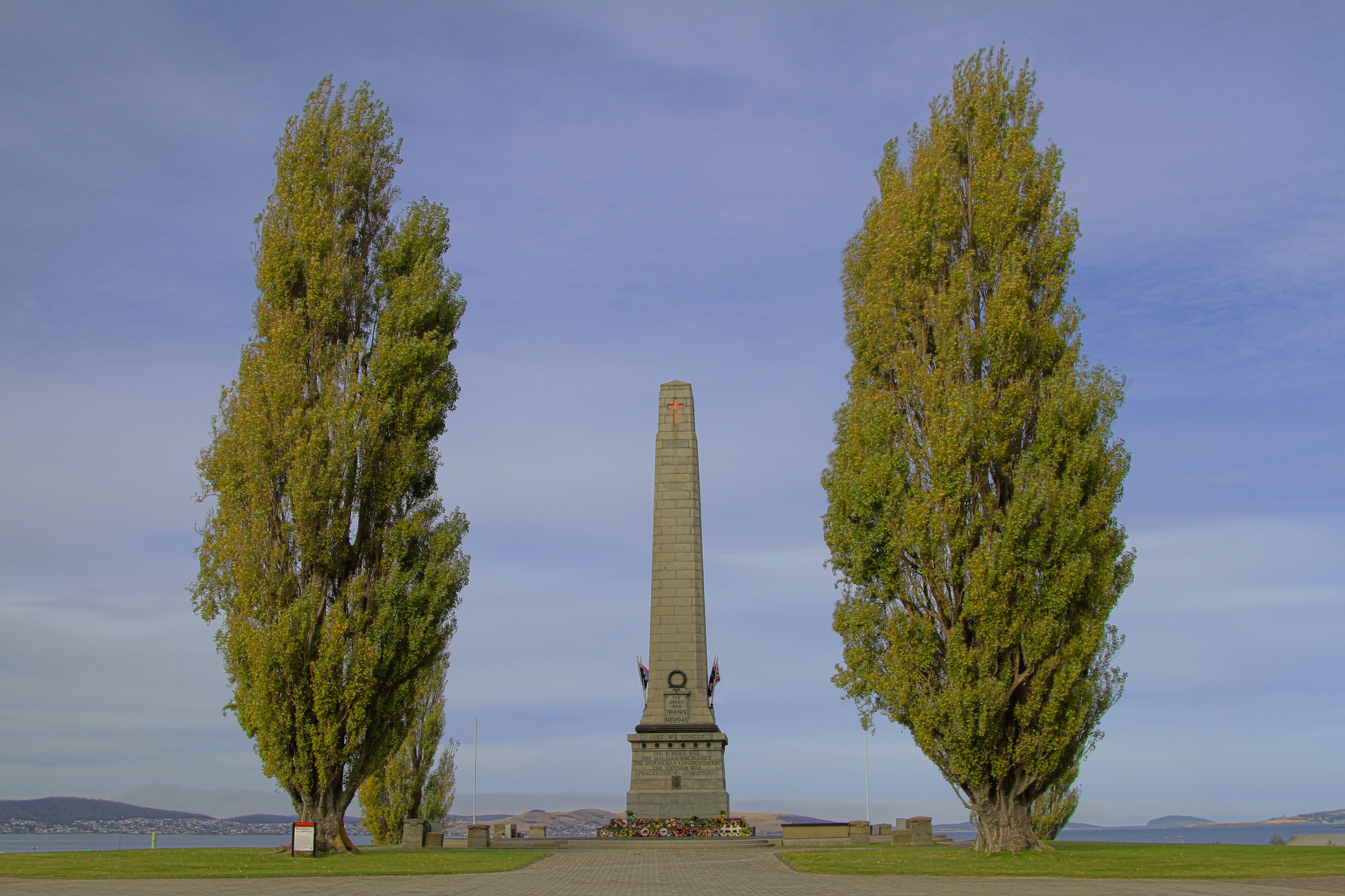
Hobart Cenotaph, Tasmania, Australia – with wreaths for Anzac Day

Australians and New Zealanders recognise 25 April as a ceremonial occasion to reflect on the cost of war and to remember those who fought and died in war. Commemorative services and marches are held at dawn, the time of the original landing, mainly at war memorials in cities and towns across both nations and the sites of some of Australia and New Zealand's more-recognised battles and greatest losses, including Villers-Bretonneux in France and Gallipoli in Turkey.

One of the traditions of Anzac Day is the gunfire breakfast (coffee with rum added) which occurs shortly after many dawn ceremonies, and recalls the "breakfast" taken by many soldiers before facing battle. Later in the day, ex-servicemen and ex-servicewomen meet and join in marches through the major cities and many smaller centres.

In 2018, female veterans were encouraged to march at the front of their sections. The "By The Left" initiative was launched following a number of reported cases where servicewomen had been challenged that they were wearing their medals on the wrong side, as people should wear their own medals on the left side of their chest, but people marching in place of their parents or other ancestors should wear that person's medals on the right side.

According to historian Carolyn Holbrook of Deakin University, "We reached Peak Anzac in 2015[,] sure, and there has been some backing off since then, but in terms of the dawn services and Anzac Day commemoration, it will remain huge for a good while yet... There is nothing better to take its place in terms of a national mythology."

In recent years, there has been greater recognition of the often overlooked role that women, immigrants and Indigenous Australians played in the wars, in the news and in the arts. Black Diggers, which premiered at the Sydney Festival, told the stories of the Aboriginal men who enlisted, whose sacrifices were ignored, and who were quickly forgotten upon their return. Country Arts SA's Aboriginal Diggers Project is a 3-year project (2017–2019) capturing the stories and experiences of Aboriginal servicemen and women who have served in Australia's Military from the Boer War to the present day through film, theatre and visual arts.

=== 2020–2022: COVID-19 pandemic ===
In 2020, most Anzac Day marches in Australia and New Zealand were cancelled due to the COVID-19 pandemic. As a consequence of the cancellation of the service, two Army veterans, Bill Sowry and Terry James, suggested standing in front of the driveways to observe a minute of silence; and, at the same time, Justin Wilbur, the son of a Vietnam veteran, offered to light a candle as a tribute to the soldiers. He created a Facebook group Aussies and Kiwis for ANZACS, and Ashleigh Leckie, a Navy veteran, combined their ideas and put forth what we now know as the Driveway at Dawn movement. This movement was later adopted by the RSL and RSA and was consequently renamed Light up the Dawn and Stand at Dawn. In the United Kingdom, Kathy Lette presented a Zoom performance of The One Day of the Year with five actors performing from their homes.

In 2021, major state marches occurred although under pandemic restriction settings such as in Queensland and the Northern Territory, others with ticketing and/or restrictions on numbers marching and watching, such as the national event in Canberra, Victoria, New South Wales, South Australia and Tasmania. Overseas services were not held. Services did not happen in Perth as on 24 April Perth city and the Peel region entered a sudden 3 day COVID-19 lockdown and Anzac Day services in the affected areas were cancelled.

In 2022, dawn services returned in both Australia and in Gallipoli. The end of pandemic restriction meant crowds returned to pre-pandemic levels in Queensland New South Wales South Australia, Victoria, The ACT, Tasmania and the Northern Territory where Prime Minister Scott Morrison and Deputy Opposition Leader Richard Marles (representing Opposition Leader Anthony Albanese who was sick with COVID at the time) attended a dawn service. Perth saw the return of the dawn service for the first time in three years albeit with only 500 attendees due to ongoing COVID restrictions. Dawn services occurred in New Zealand but parades were cancelled due to the pandemic.

=== Post-pandemic: 2023–present ===
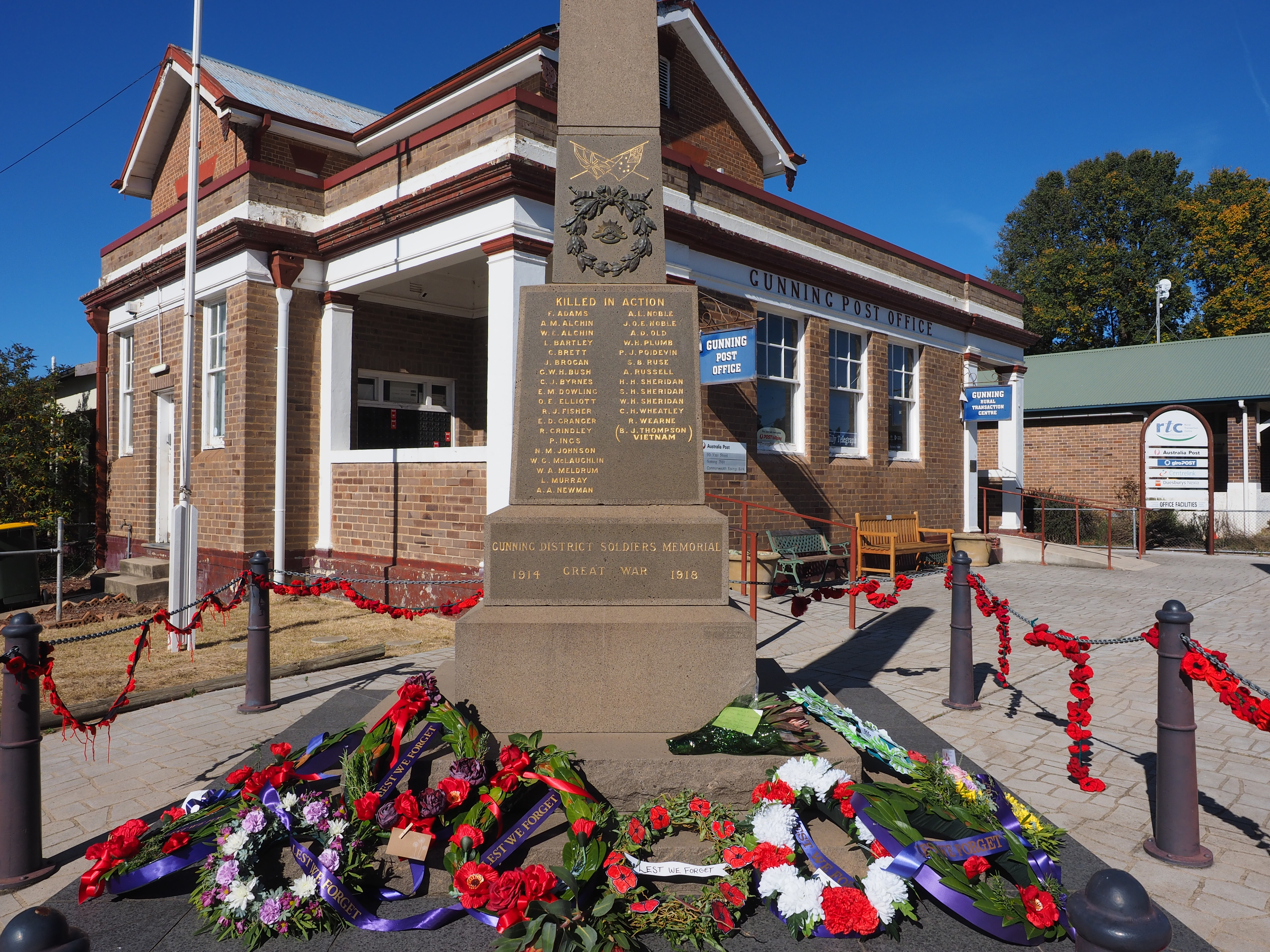
Wreathes left on the Gunning District Soldiers Memorial in Gunning at the 2026 Anzac Day ceremony

In 2023, 30,000 attended the Canberra war memorial service, continuing a trend since 2015 of declining crowds.

In 2025, a bill was introduced by the New Zealand Government to change the official scope of ANZAC Day to include all persons, enlisted or not, who served New Zealand in times of war. This expands the previous definition, which was limited to service members who were involved in wars from World War I to the Vietnam War and service members who had died at any point. Neither definition involves participants in the New Zealand Wars, although they are recognised on the National Day of Commemoration for the New Zealand Wars, albeit not with a public holiday.

== As a public holiday ==
ANZAC Day is a public holiday in Australia, New Zealand and Tonga (including in the dependencies of Christmas Island, the Cocos (Keeling) Islands, the Cook Islands, Niue, Norfolk Island and Tokelau).

== Dawn service and commemoration in Australia ==
=== Dawn service ===
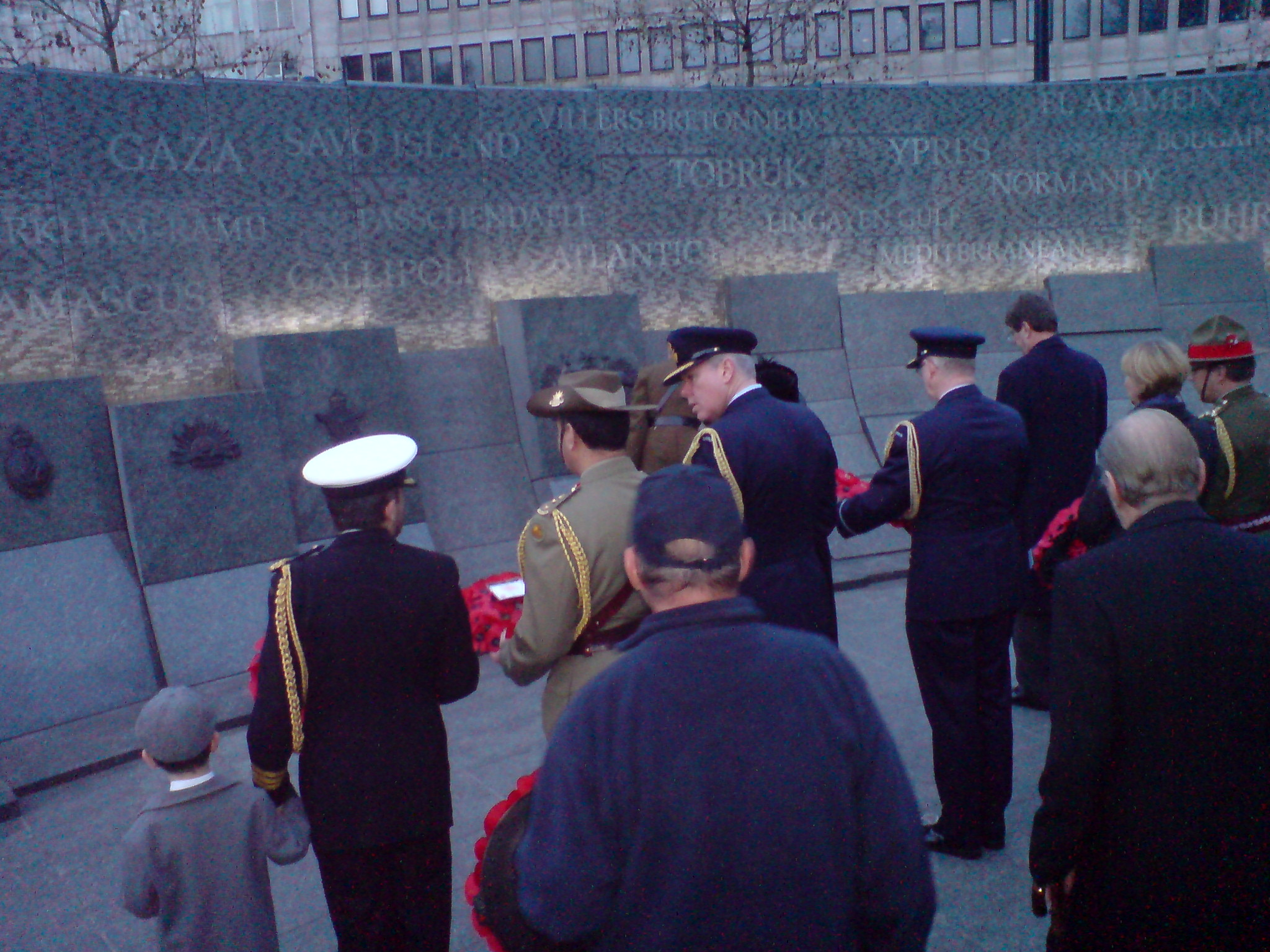
The wreath-laying at the 2008 dawn service at the Australian War Memorial at Hyde Park Corner, London

A dawn service was held on the Western Front by an Australian battalion on the first anniversary of the Gallipoli landing on 25 April 1916, and historians agree that in Australia dawn services spontaneously popped up around the country to commemorate the fallen at Gallipoli in the years after this. The timing of the dawn service, traditionally held at 4:28 am, is based on the time that the ANZAC forces started the landing on the Gallipoli peninsula, but also has origins in a combination of military, symbolic and religious traditions. Various stories name different towns as having the first ever service in Australia, including Albany, Western Australia, but no definite proof has been found to corroborate any of them. In Rockhampton, Queensland, on 26 April 1916, over 600 people attended an interdenominational service that started at 6:30 am. However, the dawn service held at the Sydney Cenotaph in 1928 can lay claim to being the first of a continuous tradition. The 1931 service at the Cenotaph was the first attended by the Governor and representatives of state and federal governments.

Dawn services were originally very simple and in many cases they were restricted to veterans only, to remember and reflect among the comrades with whom they shared a special bond. Before dawn the gathered veterans would be ordered to stand-to and a lone bugler would play the "Last Post". Two minutes of silence would follow, concluded with the "Reveille". In more recent times the families of veterans and the general public have been encouraged to take part in dawn services. Some of the ceremonies have also become more elaborate, incorporating hymns, prayer readings, laying of wreaths, laments and the playing of God Defend New Zealand and Advance Australia Fair, but others have retained the simple format of the dawn stand-to. The fourth stanza of Laurence Binyon's poem "For the Fallen" (known as the "Ode of Remembrance", or simply as "the Ode") is often recited.

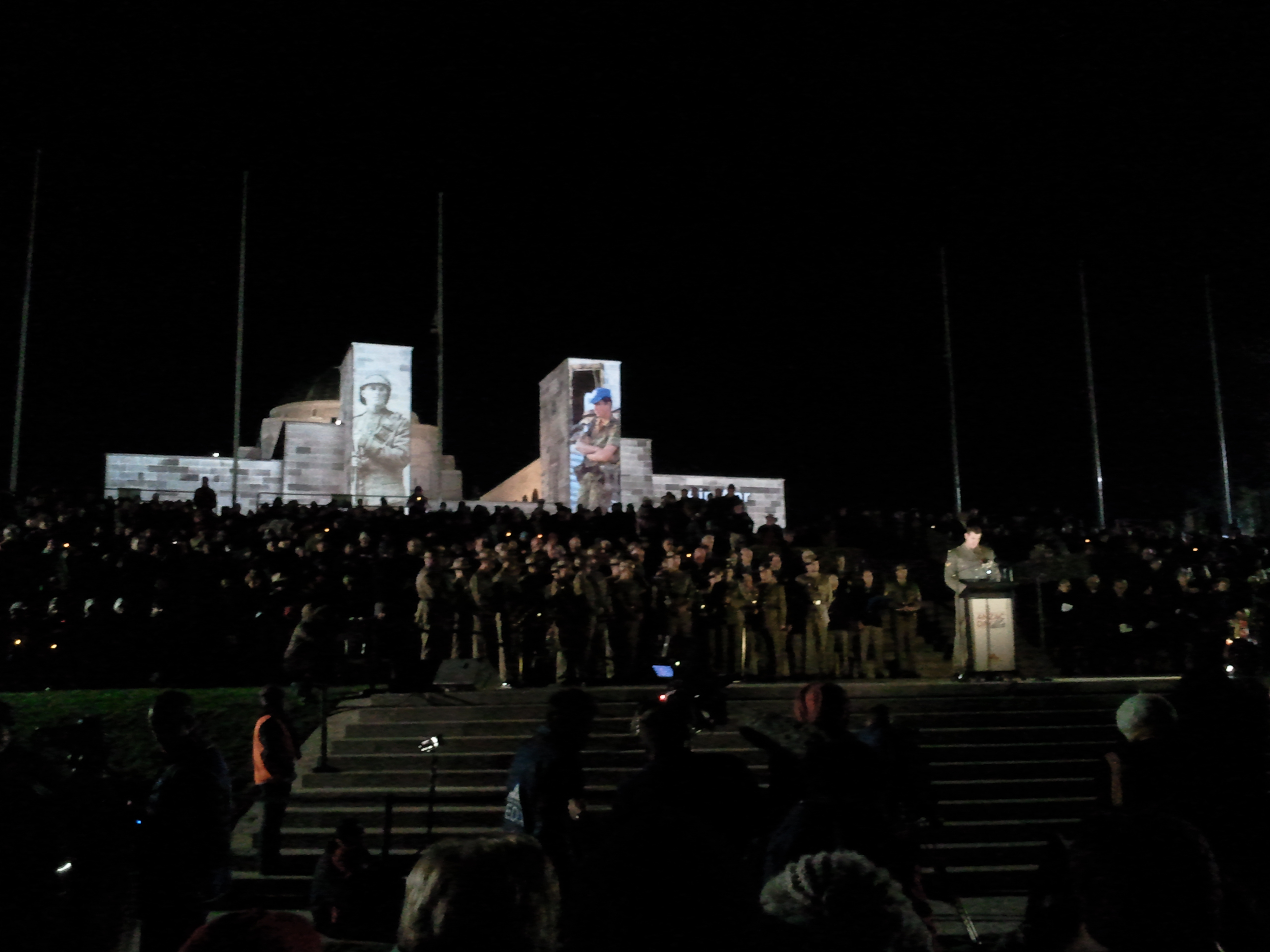
Australian War Memorial Anzac Day dawn service, 25 April 2013. The crowd of around 35,000 people is addressed by Corporal Ben Roberts-Smith VC MG who is reading stories and anecdotes from Australian service men and women relating to the war in Afghanistan.

=== Commemorative services and traditions ===
Despite federation being proclaimed in Australia in 1901, it is argued that the national identity of Australia was largely forged during the violent conflict of World War I, and the most iconic event in the war for most Australians was the landing at Gallipoli. Dr. Paul Skrebels of the University of South Australia has noted that Anzac Day has continued to grow in popularity; even the threat of a terrorist attack at the Gallipoli site in 2004 did not deter some 15,000 Australians from making the pilgrimage to Turkey to commemorate the fallen ANZAC troops.

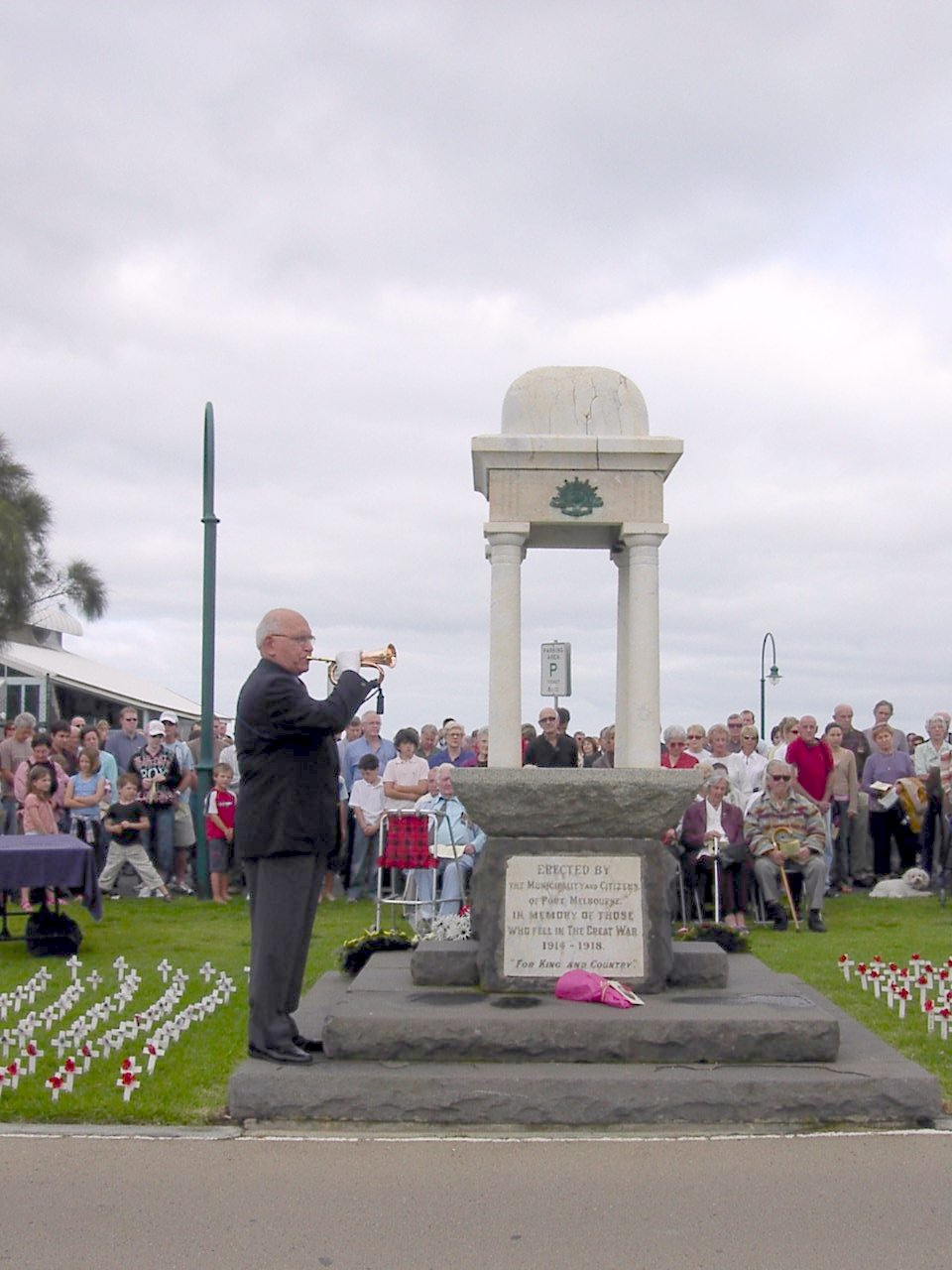
The Last Post is played at an Anzac Day ceremony in Port Melbourne, Victoria, 25 April 2005. Ceremonies like this are held in virtually every suburb and town in Australia and New Zealand on Anzac Day each year.

In cities and towns nationwide, marches by veterans from all past wars, as well as current serving members of the Australian Defence Force and Reserves, allied veterans, Australian Defence Force Cadets and Australian Air League, members of Scouts Australia, Guides Australia, and other service groups take place. The Anzac Day March from each state capital is televised live with commentary. These events are generally followed by social gatherings of veterans, hosted either in a public house or in an RSL club, often including a traditional Australian gambling game called two-up, which was an extremely popular pastime with ANZAC soldiers. (In most Australian states and territories, gambling is forbidden outside of licensed venues; however, due to the significance of this tradition, two-up is legal only on Anzac Day.)

A National Ceremony is held at the Australian War Memorial, starting at 10:30 am, with the traditional order of service including the Commemorative Address, wreath laying, hymns, the sounding of the Last Post, observance of one minute's silence, and the national anthems of Australia and New Zealand. Families often place artificial red poppies beside the names of relatives on the Memorial's Roll of Honour. Sprigs of rosemary or laurel are often worn on lapels.

Although commemoration events are always held on 25 April, most states and territories currently observe a substitute public holiday on the following Monday when Anzac Day falls on a Sunday. When Anzac Day falls on Easter Monday, such as in 2011, the Easter Monday holiday is transferred to Tuesday. This followed a 2008 meeting of the Council for the Australian Federation in which the states and territories made an in-principle agreement to work towards making this a universal practice. However, in 2009, the Legislative Council of Tasmania rejected a bill amendment that would have enabled the substitute holiday in that state.

=== Commemorative postage stamps ===
Australia Post has issued stamps over the years to commemorate Anzac Day, the first being in 1935 for the 20th anniversary of the Gallipoli landings.

The list of issued stamps includes:

- 1935: 20th Anniversary (2 values) 2-pence (equivalent to A$1.09 in 2022) Red and 1-shilling (equivalent to A$10.94 in 2022) Black featuring the London Cenotaph.
- 1955: the then current 3 1/2-pence (equivalent to A$0.39 in 2022) Purple Nursing commemorative stamp was privately overprinted with the words "ANZAC 1915–1955 40 YEARS LEST WE FORGET" and a value ranging from 1 pence to £A 1 (equivalent to A$38.58 in 2022) was also added which was the fundraising amount in addition to the legal cost of stamp of which the denomination was 3 1/2 pence. Eight values were issued and were intended to raise funds for the Anzac commemorations. It is believed these stamps were authorised by the secretary of a leading Melbourne RSL club.
- 1965: 50th Anniversary (3 values) 5-pence (equivalent to A$0.61 in 2022) Khaki, 8-pence (equivalent to A$0.91 in 2022) Blue and 2-shilling-and-3-pence (equivalent to A$3.35 in 2022) Maroon featuring Simpson and his donkey.
- 1990: 75th Anniversary (5 values) $0.41 × 2, $0.65, $1, and $1.10 all featuring various Anzac themes.
- 2000: ANZAC legends (4 values) $0.45 × 4 featuring Walter Parker, Roy Longmore, Alec Campbell and the Anzac medal.
- 2008: five stamps depicting Australians showing respect and lines from the Ode of Remembrance
- 2014–2018: A Century of War
  - 2014: Tri-services
  - 2015: War Animals
  - 2016: Vietnam War
  - 2017: Women in War
  - 2018: War Memorials: five base-rate ($1) stamps depicting Cobbers Statue at Australian Memorial Park; the Avenue of Honour in Ballarat; Tomb of the Unknown Australian Soldier, Canberra; Darwin Cenotaph; and the Legacy Memorial at the Shrine of Remembrance in Melbourne
  - 2024: Picturing War: three $1.50 stamps depicting photographers Herbert Baldwin; Damien Parer; George Silk

=== Australian rules football ===
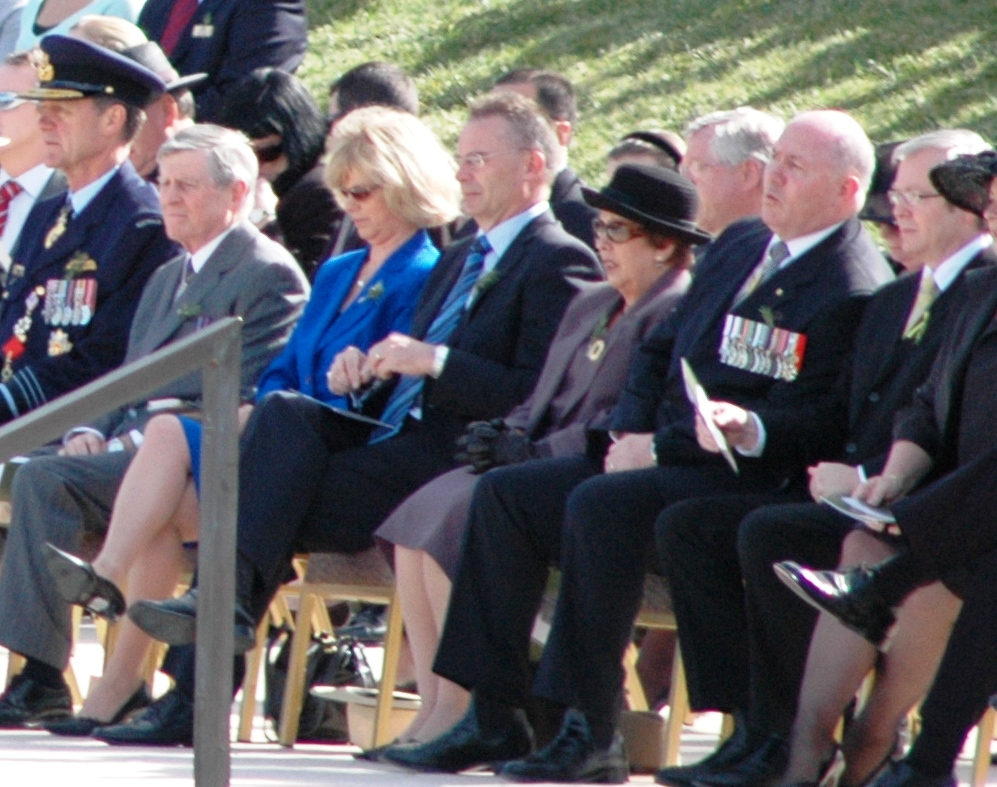
In attendance at the 2008 Anzac Day National Service at the Australian War Memorial in Canberra are Angus Houston, Chief of the Defence Force (Australia) (left), Murray Gleeson then Chief Justice of the High Court of Australia, Jon Stanhope, Chief Minister of the Australian Capital Territory (centre), Peter Cosgrove, immediate past Chief of the Defence Force (Australia) (second from right), and Kevin Rudd, Prime Minister of Australia (right).

During many wars, Australian rules football matches have been played overseas in places like northern Africa, Vietnam, and Iraq as a celebration of Australian culture and as a bonding exercise between soldiers.

The modern-day tradition began in 1995 and is played every year between traditional AFL rivals Collingwood and Essendon at the Melbourne Cricket Ground. This annual match is often considered the biggest of the AFL season outside of the finals, sometimes drawing bigger crowds than all but the Grand Final, and often selling out in advance. The inaugural match in 1995 drew a crowd of 94,825 people, with the 2023 match drawing a crowd of 95,179, the second biggest home and away crowd in AFL history. The Anzac Medal is awarded to the player in the match who best exemplifies the Anzac spirit – skill, courage, self-sacrifice, teamwork and fair play. As of 2024, Collingwood hold the advantage 17 wins to 10, with two draws (in 1995 and 2024). The match was not played in 2020 due to the COVID-19 pandemic.

In 2013, St Kilda and the Sydney Swans played an Anzac Day game in Wellington, New Zealand, the first AFL game played for premiership points outside of Australia. The winning team, Sydney, were presented with the inaugural Simpson–Henderson Trophy by the Prime Minister of New Zealand. The trophy was named after two notable Anzac soldiers: John Simpson Kirkpatrick and Richard Alexander Henderson.

=== Rugby League football ===
Beginning in 1997, the Anzac Test, a rugby league test match, commemorated Anzac Day, though it was typically played prior to Anzac Day. The match was always played between the Australian and New Zealand national teams, and drew attendances of between 20,000 and 45,000 spectators. The final Anzac test occurred in 2017.

Domestically, matches have been played on Anzac Day since 1927 (with occasional exceptions). Since 2002, the National Rugby League (NRL) has followed the lead of the Australian Football League, hosting a match between traditional rivals St. George Illawarra Dragons and the Sydney Roosters each year to commemorate Anzac Day in the Anzac Day Cup, although these two sides had previously met on Anzac Day several times as early as the 1970s. Between 2009 and 2023, an additional Anzac Day game has been played between the Melbourne Storm and New Zealand Warriors; the South Sydney Rabbitohs replaced the New Zealand Warriors in 2024. The Warriors still play on Anzac Day but in New Zealand and against a different opponent each year.

== Commemoration in New Zealand ==
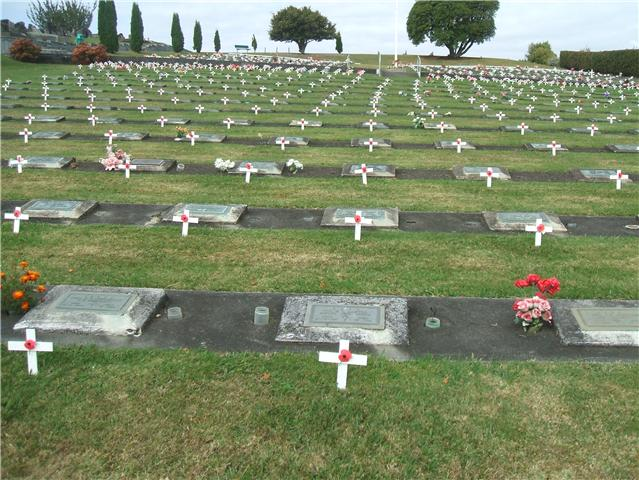
Each year on ANZAC Day in Te Awamutu, New Zealand, the graves of War Veterans are decorated.

New Zealand's commemoration of Anzac Day is similar. The number of New Zealanders attending Anzac Day events in New Zealand, and at Gallipoli, is increasing. For some, the day adds weight to the idea that war is futile.

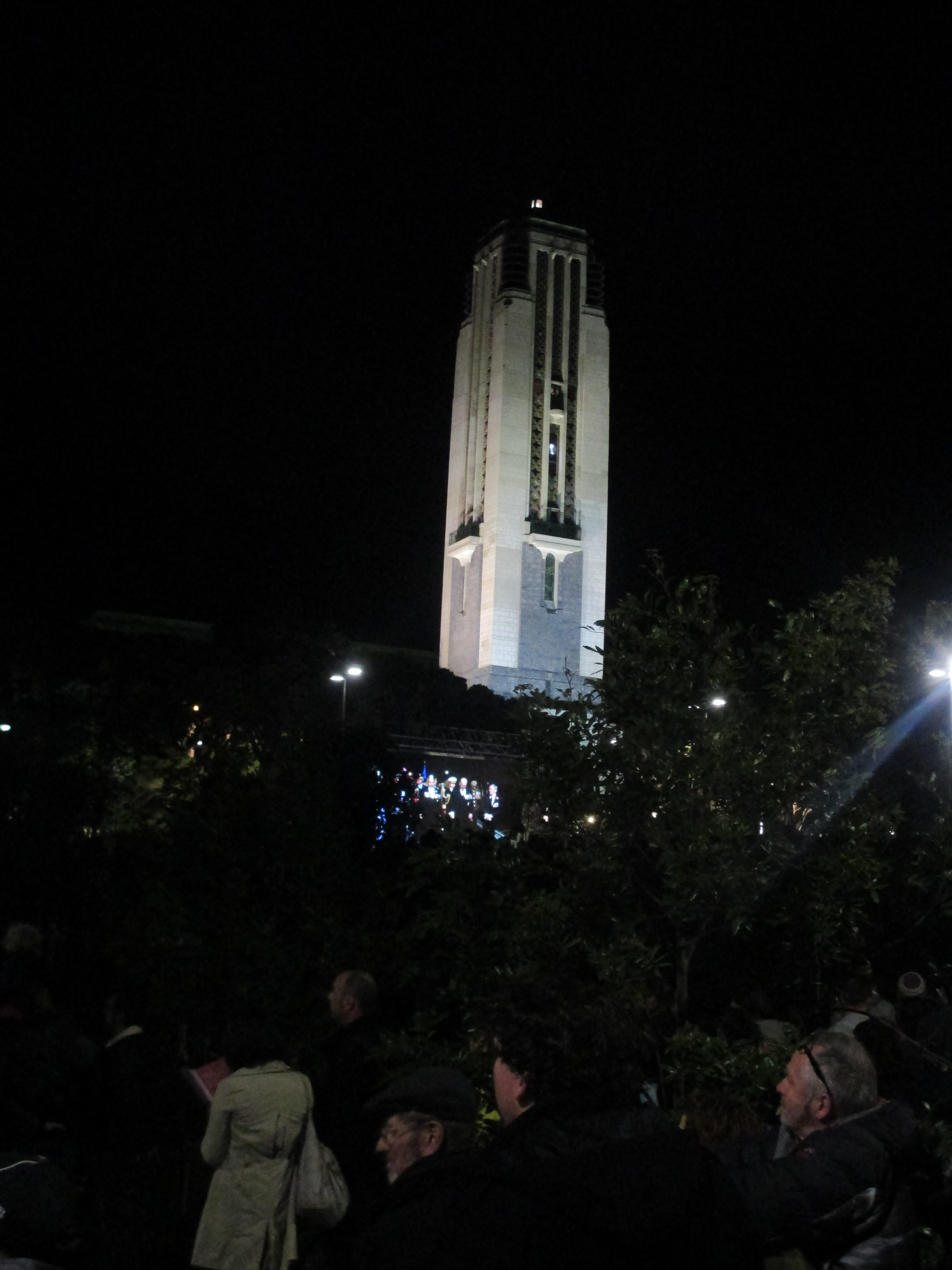
Dawn service in Wellington, New Zealand, on the 100th anniversary of the landing at Gallipoli

Dawn marches and other memorials nationwide are often attended by the New Zealand Defence Force, the New Zealand Cadet Forces, members of the New Zealand Police, Fire and Emergency New Zealand, Order of St John Ambulance Service (Youth and Adult Volunteers) as well as Scouting New Zealand, GirlGuiding New Zealand and other uniformed community service groups and often a local pipe band to lead or accompany the march, and sometimes a brass band to accompany the hymns.

Historian Rowan Light has called Anzac Day New Zealand's national day of unity. He also said that the day did not die out after the last First World War veterans passed away, as some had expected.

Paper poppies are widely distributed by the Returned Services Association and worn as symbols of remembrance. This tradition follows that of the wearing of poppies on Remembrance Sunday in other Commonwealth countries.

The day is a public holiday in New Zealand. Shops are prohibited from opening before 1 pm under the Shop Trading Hours Act 1990. A prior act passed in 1949 prevented the holiday from being Mondayised (moved to the 26th or 27th should the 25th fall on a weekend), although this drew criticism from trade unionists and Labour Party politicians. In 2013, a member's bill introduced by Labour MP David Clark to Mondayise Anzac Day and Waitangi Day passed, despite opposition from the governing National Party.

== Commemoration at Gallipoli ==
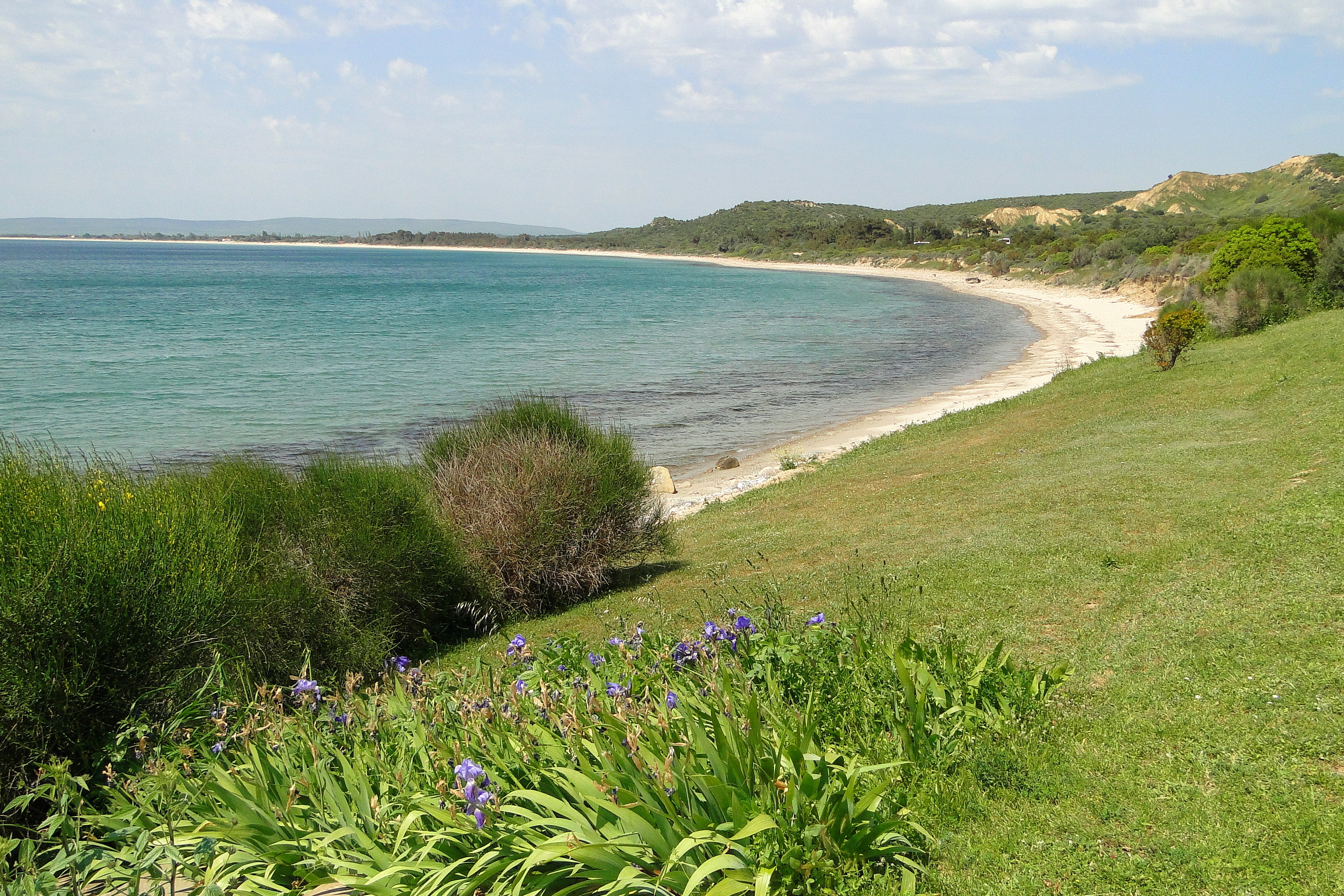
North Beach looking toward Suvla in Anzac Cove in Turkey

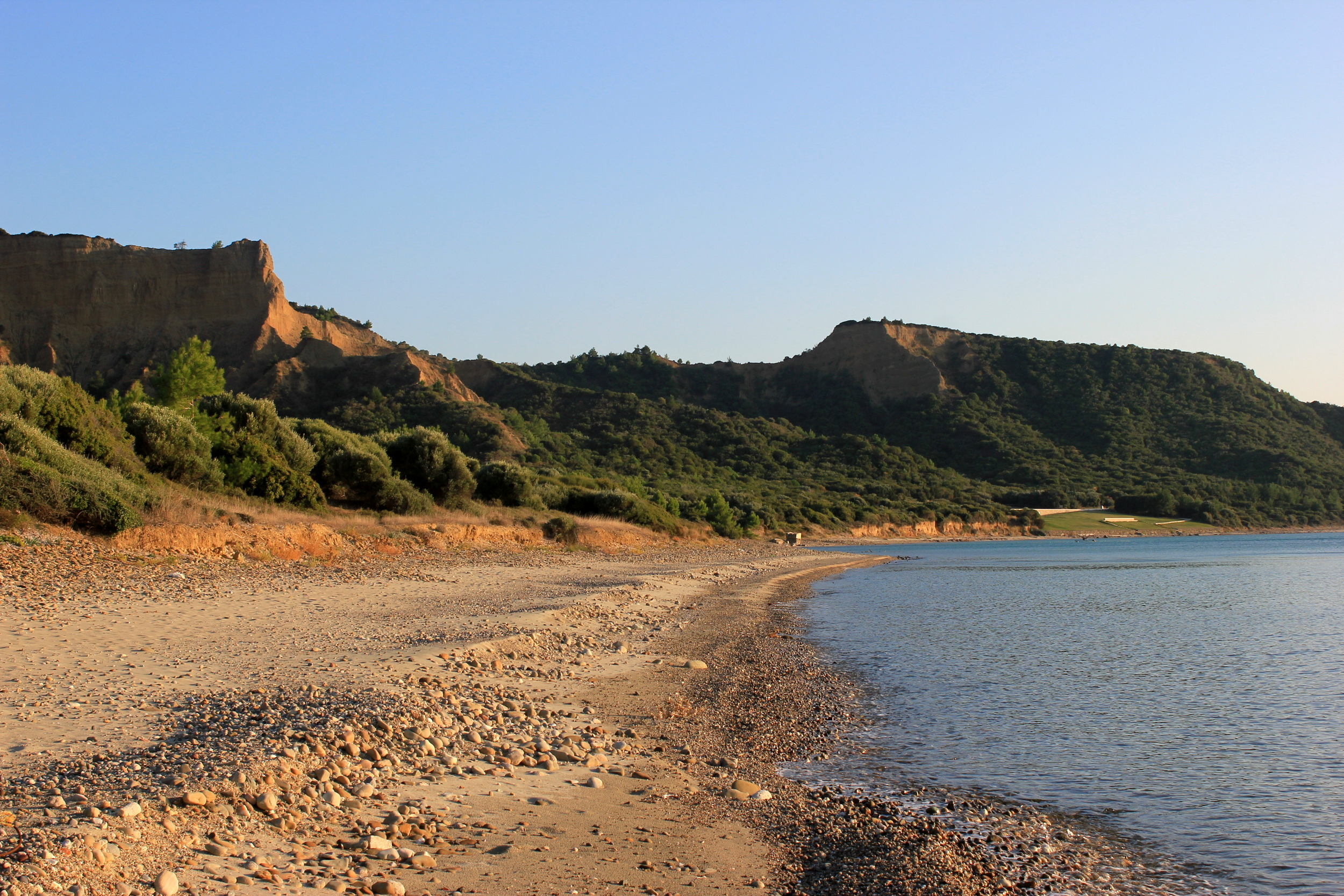
North Beach with sphinx rock in the background in Anzac Cove in Turkey

In Turkey the name ANZAC Cove was officially recognised by the Turkish government on Anzac Day in 1985. That year, a monolith installed at Ari Burnu Cemetery (ANZAC Beach) was inscribed with a quotation falsely attributed to Kemal Atatürk in 1934:

Those heroes that shed their blood and lost their lives ... You are now lying in the soil of a friendly country. Therefore rest in peace. There is no difference between the Johnnies and the Mehmets to us where they lie side by side here in this country of ours ... You, the mothers who sent their sons from faraway countries, wipe away your tears; your sons are now lying in our bosom and are in peace. After having lost their lives on this land they have become our sons as well.

The words also appear on the Kemal Atatürk Memorial, Canberra, and the Atatürk Memorial in Wellington. However, despite the common attribution to Atatürk by governments and politicians from Australia and Turkey, historians have found no direct evidence that Atatürk ever spoke these words. A version of the quote first appeared in 1953 from a Turkish journalist with the later inclusion of the phrase "There is no difference between the Johnnies and the Mehmets" emerging in 1978. Indeed, Atatürk never said this, it was made up by Şükrü Kaya for diplomatic reasons. In fact, Atatürk considered the ANZACs to have been invaders and considered them inferior to the Turks.

In 1990, to mark the 75th anniversary of the Gallipoli landing, government officials from Australia and New Zealand, including Australian Prime Minister Bob Hawke and New Zealand governor-general Paul Reeves, as well as most of the last surviving Gallipoli veterans, travelled to Turkey for a special Dawn Service at Gallipoli. The Gallipoli Dawn Service was held at the Ari Burnu War Cemetery at Anzac Cove, but the growing numbers of people attending resulted in the construction of a more spacious site on North Beach, known as the Anzac Commemorative Site in time for the year 2000 service.

A ballot was held to allocate passes for Australians and New Zealanders wishing to attend Anzac Day commemorations at Gallipoli in 2015. Of the 10,500 people who could be safely, securely and comfortably accommodated at the Anzac Commemorative Site, in 2015 this comprised places for 8,000 Australians, 2,000 New Zealanders and 500 official representatives of all nations involved in the Gallipoli campaign. Only those who received an offer of attendance passes attended the commemorations in 2015.

== Commemoration in other countries ==
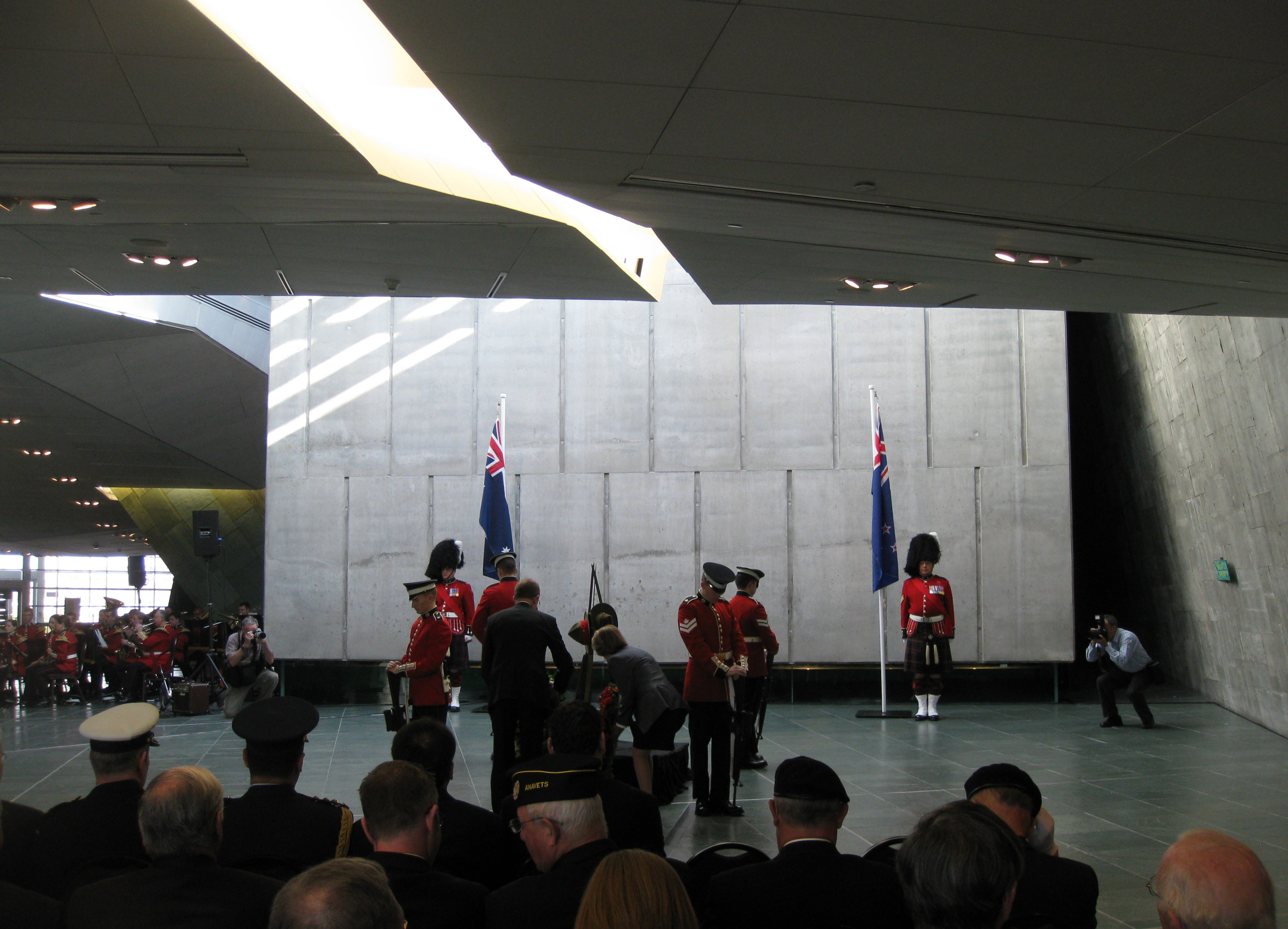
The high commissioners of Australia and New Zealand lay wreaths at an Anzac Day ceremony at the Canadian War Museum in Ottawa.

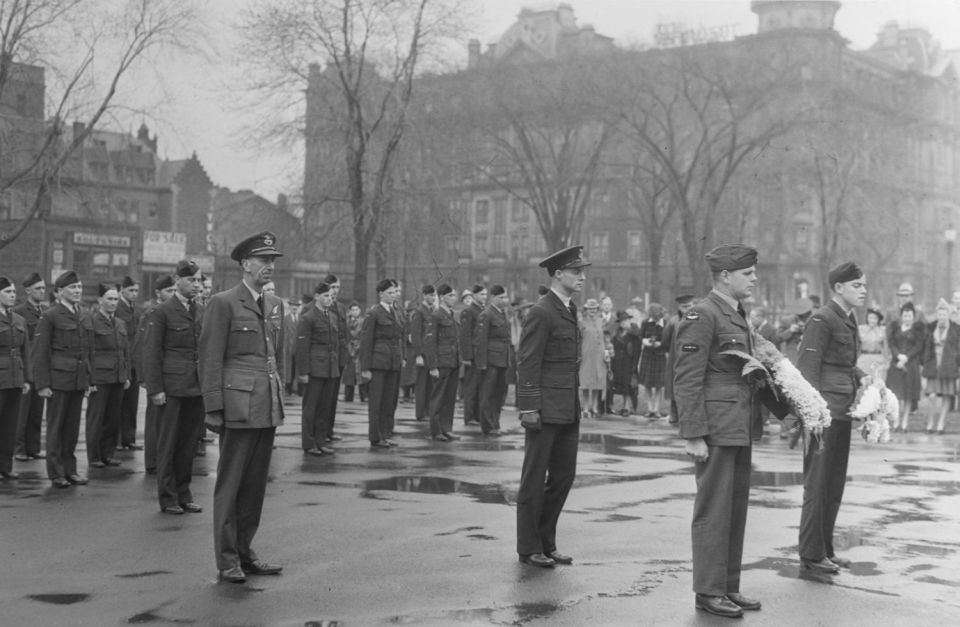
Anzac Day ceremony in Montreal, Quebec

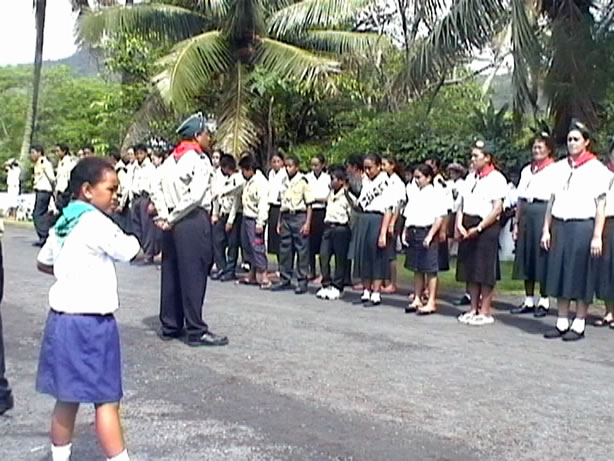
Boys Brigade review on 25 April 2005 (Rarotonga)

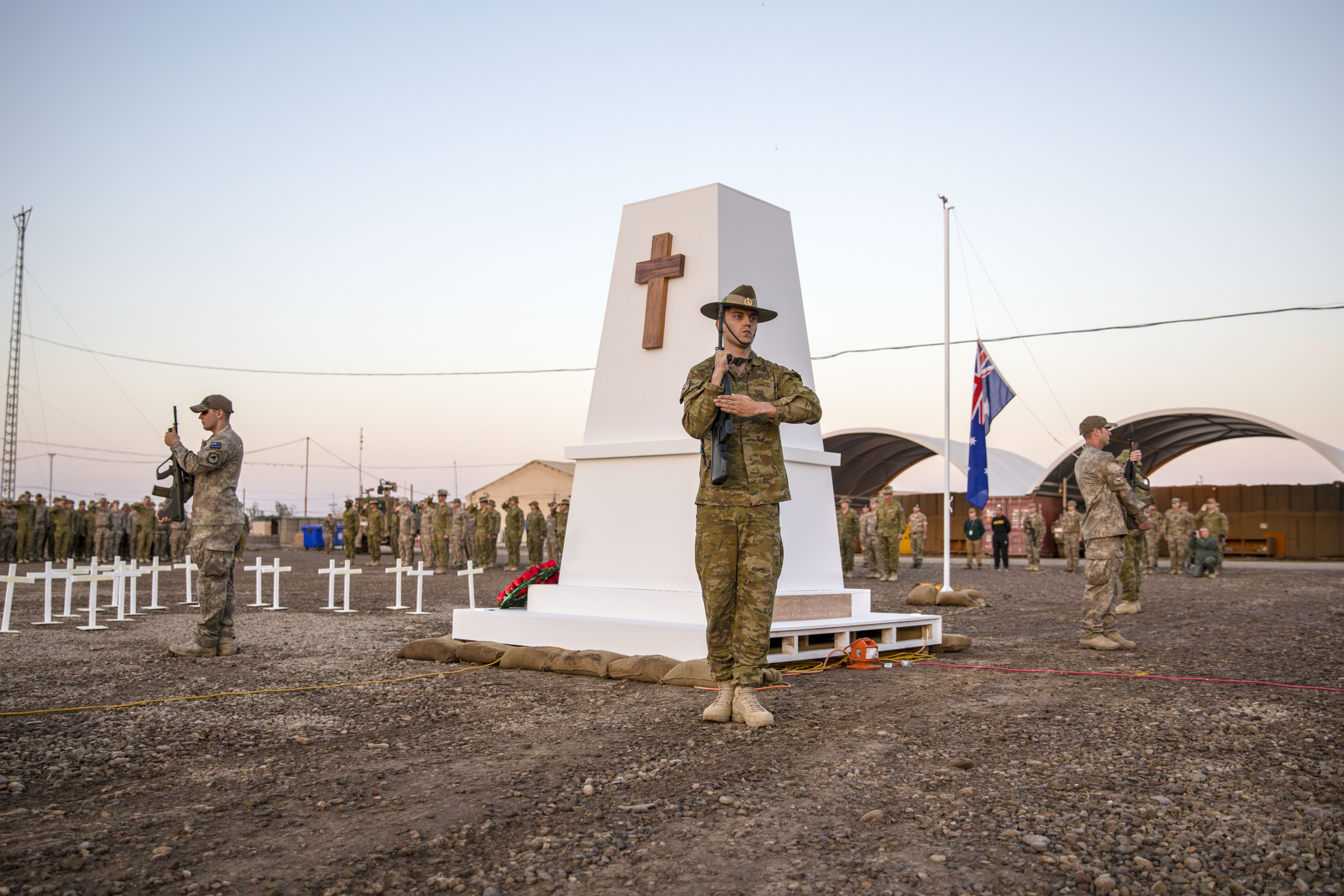
Australian and New Zealand soldiers during an Anzac Day dawn service at Camp Taji in Iraq during 2018

=== Antarctica ===
- Scott Base holds a ceremony honouring the fallen on Anzac Day. Americans from the nearby McMurdo Station are often invited.

=== Belgium ===
- In Ypres, Belgium, a dawn service is held at the Buttes New British Cemetery in Zonnebeke; there is a 9:30 am service at the Tyne Cot Cemetery; a procession from the Ypres Cloth Hall to Menin Gate begins at 11:10 am and the Wreath-laying ceremony at the Belgian War Memorial takes place at 11:35 am. In addition, the nightly Last Post Ceremony takes place at the Menin Gate at 8 pm, when buglers from the Last Post Association sound this act of homage as they have every night since 1928.
- In Comines-Warneton, The Ploegsteert Toronto Avenue Cemetery Commemoration Service takes place at 4 pm.

=== Brunei ===
- In Muara, a pre-dawn service is held on 25 April at the Brunei-Australia Memorial as a remembrance of the servicemen and women of Australia and New Zealand. The commemoration is held on Muara Beach, the site where the Allied forces led by Australia's 9th Division landed in Brunei on 10 June 1945 as part of the campaign to liberate Borneo from the Japanese.

=== Canada ===
- In St. John's, Newfoundland, the Gallipoli offensive is commemorated each year on 25 April by the Royal Newfoundland Regiment, which was the only unit from North America to fight on Gallipoli, who hold a march from Government House through the streets ending at the National War Memorial. Members of both the Australian and New Zealand armed forces are invited each year to participate in the march and wreath laying ceremonies.
- In Ottawa, Ontario, a service starting at 9 am is held at the Canadian War Museum.
- In Toronto, Ontario, Anzac service is held at the Armour Heights Officers' Mess, Canadian Forces College.
- In London, Ontario a dawn service starting at 5:45 am was held in 2017 at the Worseley Barracks.
- In Winnipeg, Manitoba Anzac Day was commemorated by the Down Under Club of Winnipeg on Saturday 29 April 2017 from 6 pm until 10 pm at the Scandinavian Cultural Centre.
- In Calgary, Alberta, a Cenotaph Service is held annually at Central Park with participation from the local military, held in the evening.
- In Edmonton, Alberta, Anzac Day ceremonies have been held since 2009.
- In Vancouver, British Columbia, Anzac service is held at Victory Square, Vancouver.
- In Comox, BC, Vancouver Island Anzac Day is held on the Sunday closest to 25 April. Hosted by the HMCS Alberni Museum and Memorial, the ceremony is held in various locations each year on Vancouver Island.

=== Cyprus ===
- In Nicosia, a dawn service is held at the Wayne's Keep Military Cemetery. The ceremony is attended by officials of the United Nations Peacekeeping Force in Cyprus (UNFICYP) and the Australian High Commissioner.

=== Egypt ===
- In Cairo, Egypt, Anzac Day is remembered by the expatriate New Zealand and Australian communities with a dawn ceremony held at the Cairo Commonwealth War Memorial Cemetery, Abu Seifen Street, Old Cairo. New Zealand and Australian Embassies rotate hosting the service.

=== France ===
- In the town of Villers-Bretonneux, the Australian government holds an annual dawn service. For decades, the commemoration was organised by French locals (on the next closest weekend to Anzac Day) until the Australian government took over the organisation of an Anzac Day dawn service at the Australian National Memorial, Villers-Bretonneux. Historian Romain Fathi has explained that several factors contributed to this "commemorative take-over", such as the need to have an official service in France, a deteriorating relationship with Turkey in the mid-2000s that jeopardised access to Anzac Cove, and associating Anzac Day with victory on the Western Front, rather than defeat at Gallipoli. Indeed, in the Australian narrative of Second Villers-Bretonneux, the town was re-taken on 25 April 1918, a symbolic anniversary. In fact, that operation was not finished until 27 April.
- The town of Fromelles holds an annual service at Pheasant Wood Military Cemetery where a few hundred lost Australian soldiers were reburied after being discovered nearby. The ceremony is attended by representatives of the Australian government and French military. The Battle of Fromelles, an important battle for Australians, happened near the town.
- In France services are also held in the towns of Le Quesnoy and Longueval. Since the 1990s, an Anzac Day service has also been held at Bullecourt, organised by local French authorities.
- In French Polynesia, Anzac Day has been commemorated with an official ceremony held in Papeete since 2006. The 2009 ceremony was attended by French Polynesia President Oscar Temaru, who praised the "courage and liberty" of Australian and New Zealand soldiers in a statement.

=== Germany ===
- In Germany, Anzac Day is commemorated in Berlin, at the Commonwealth War Graves (Commonwealth Kriegsgräber) in Charlottenburg.

=== Greece ===
- In the Greek capital of Athens, Anzac Day is commemorated at the Phaleron Allied War Cemetery.
- Since 1998, Anzac Day has also been commemorated in the island of Lemnos, which served as an Allied base of operations during the Gallipoli campaign, and where there are two Allied cemeteries, at Mudros Bay and at Portianou.

=== Hong Kong ===
- In Hong Kong, a simple dawn commemorative service is held at the Cenotaph in Central, with a member of the Hong Kong Police Band playing the Last Post and Reveille from the balcony of the nearby Hong Kong Club.

=== India ===
- On 25 April 2019 a wreath-laying ceremony was held for the first time in the Commonwealth War Graves Cemetery, Kolkata. The Commonwealth War Graves Cemetery in Kolkata is housed inside the Bhawanipur Cemetery and houses over 700 war graves, including those of four Australian and two New Zealand soldiers, all of whom died in World War II. The ceremony was headed by Australian high commissioner to India Harinder Sindhu and Australian consul-general in Kolkata Andrew Ford. Also present were Australian and New Zealand cricketers and support staff, who were in the city for the Indian Premier League (IPL).

=== Ireland ===
- In Dublin, Anzac Day is remembered by the expatriate New Zealand and Australian communities. In the absence of an official World War I remembrance, and in honour of Irish soldiers who fought and perished in the Dardanelles and elsewhere, Anzac Day commemorations are also attended by members of veterans groups and historical societies, including the Royal Dublin Fusiliers, ONET, the Royal British Legion, and UN Veterans. Since the mid-1980s, an evening service has been organised by the New Zealand-Ireland Association, which currently takes place in St Ann's Church, Dawson St, Dublin 2. For the 90th anniversary in 2005, a daylight service was held for the first time in the re-furbished Grangegorman Military Cemetery, Dublin 7. A Turkish Hazel tree, planted by the ambassadors of Australia, New Zealand and Turkey, commemorates this occasion. It can be found to the south of the limestone Memorial Wall. Since this date, a dawn service has been held at this location.
- At the Ballance House in County Antrim, the official New Zealand centre in Northern Ireland, an afternoon commemoration takes place.

=== Israel ===
- In Israel, a commemorative service is held at Jerusalem British War Cemetery on Anzac Day, attended by the ambassadors of Australia and New Zealand. It is also remembered at the Be'er-Sheva Anzac Memorial Centre and the ANZAC Memorial in Negev.

=== Italy ===
- In Italy, a commemorative service is held at the Rome War Cemetery, attended by high members of the military and various embassies associated with the conflict. The service is in English and Maori language. A mass of remembrance is also held.

=== Malaysia ===
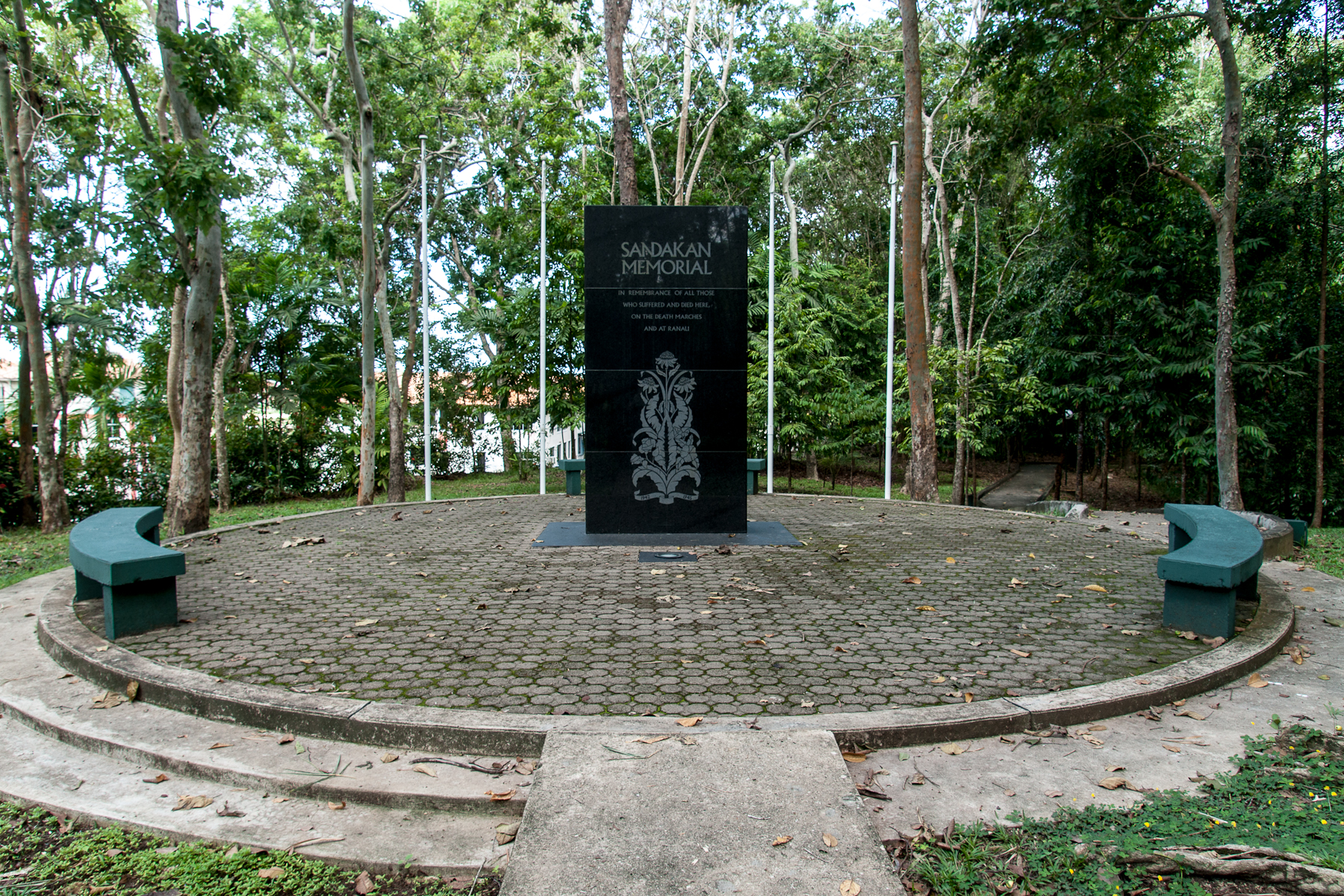
The Sandakan Memorial Park where the ANZAC Day is annually commemorated in the site of the former Sandakan Death Marches in Sabah, Malaysia.

The Australian Borneo Exhibition Group organises annual trips for ANZAC veterans and students to commemorate World War II in the states of Sabah and Sarawak.

- In Kuala Lumpur and Sandakan, Anzac Day is a memorial day to honour the Australian, British, New Zealand and local soldiers who perished during the Second World War. A commemorative service will be held like dawn service and gunfire breakfast.
- In Kota Kinabalu, a ceremony is held on 26 April at Jalan Tugu (Monument Street) to honour and remember the sacrifices of all freedom fighters including the contribution of Australia and New Zealand to the state of Sabah.
- In Kuching, a commemorative service was held at the World War II Heroes Graves Memorial in Jalan Taman Budaya (Culture Park Street) on 25 April.
- In Labuan, a commemorative service of Dawn and Twilight service are held on 25 April at the World War II Memorial, the final resting place of some 3,908 war heroes from Australia, Britain, New Zealand, India, Malaya along with those from Borneo and the Philippines who died during the occupation of British Borneo by the Japanese.

=== Malta ===
- Anzac Day has been commemorated in Malta since 1916. Since 1979 the service has been held at the Pietà Military Cemetery, as it contains the highest number of ANZAC war graves in Malta.

=== Pacific Ocean island nations ===
- Anzac Day is observed in the Cook Islands, Niue, Pitcairn Islands, and Tonga.
- It was previously a national holiday in Papua New Guinea and Samoa. Until 1981 Papua New Guinea commemorated its war dead on Anzac Day; however, since then Remembrance Day has been observed on 23 July, the date of the first action of the Papuan Infantry Battalion against the Japanese at Awala in 1942 during the Kokoda Track campaign.
- In Kiribati, Anzac Day is commemorated at the Coast Watchers' Memorial on the islet of Betio in South Tarawa, the site of a massacre by beheading of New Zealand military and civilian coastwatchers by Japanese forces prior to US landings in 1943.
- See the France section above for French Polynesia.

=== Poland ===
- In Warsaw every year, a joint ceremony is held with Australian, New Zealand and Polish representatives at the Tomb of the Unknown Soldier in Piłsudski Square.

=== Singapore ===
- In Kranji, an Anzac Day dawn service is held by the Australian and New Zealand communities in Singapore on 25 April at the Kranji War Memorial to commemorate the landings at Gallipoli during the First World War against the Ottoman Empire. Memorial services are also held annually at the Kranji War Cemetery to commemorate those who died during the occupation of Singapore by the Japanese.

=== South Sudan ===
- In South Sudan Australian Defence Force members and fellow peacekeepers serving with the United Nations Mission commemorated Anzac Day in 2018.

=== Thailand ===
- In Kanchanaburi, Thailand, a dawn service is held at Hellfire Pass, a rock cutting dug by allied prisoners of war and Asian labourers for the Thai-Burma Railway. This cutting is where the greatest number of lives were lost during railway construction. The dawn service is followed by a gunfire breakfast. At 10 am or 11 am a second ceremony is held at the main POW cemetery in the city of Kanchanaburi. In addition to this, in 2018 the Australian consulate-general held a dawn service in Phuket at 5.45 am at Phuket Yacht Club, Soi Phon Chalong. The closest Saturday to Anzac Day also sees an Australian rules football match between the Thailand Tigers Australian rules football club and a team invited from neighbouring countries. In 2018 the Thailand Tigers and the Vietnam Swans played their first ever Anzac Day home and away series over two weekends.

=== Timor Leste ===
- In the capital city Dili, in the Australian Army peace keeping base, a dawn service is held each ANZAC Day.

=== United Kingdom ===
ANZAC day is officially observed in the United Kingdom, and has been since 1916, and is commemorated at events in London and around the country, but the day does not have public holiday status like in Australia and New Zealand.

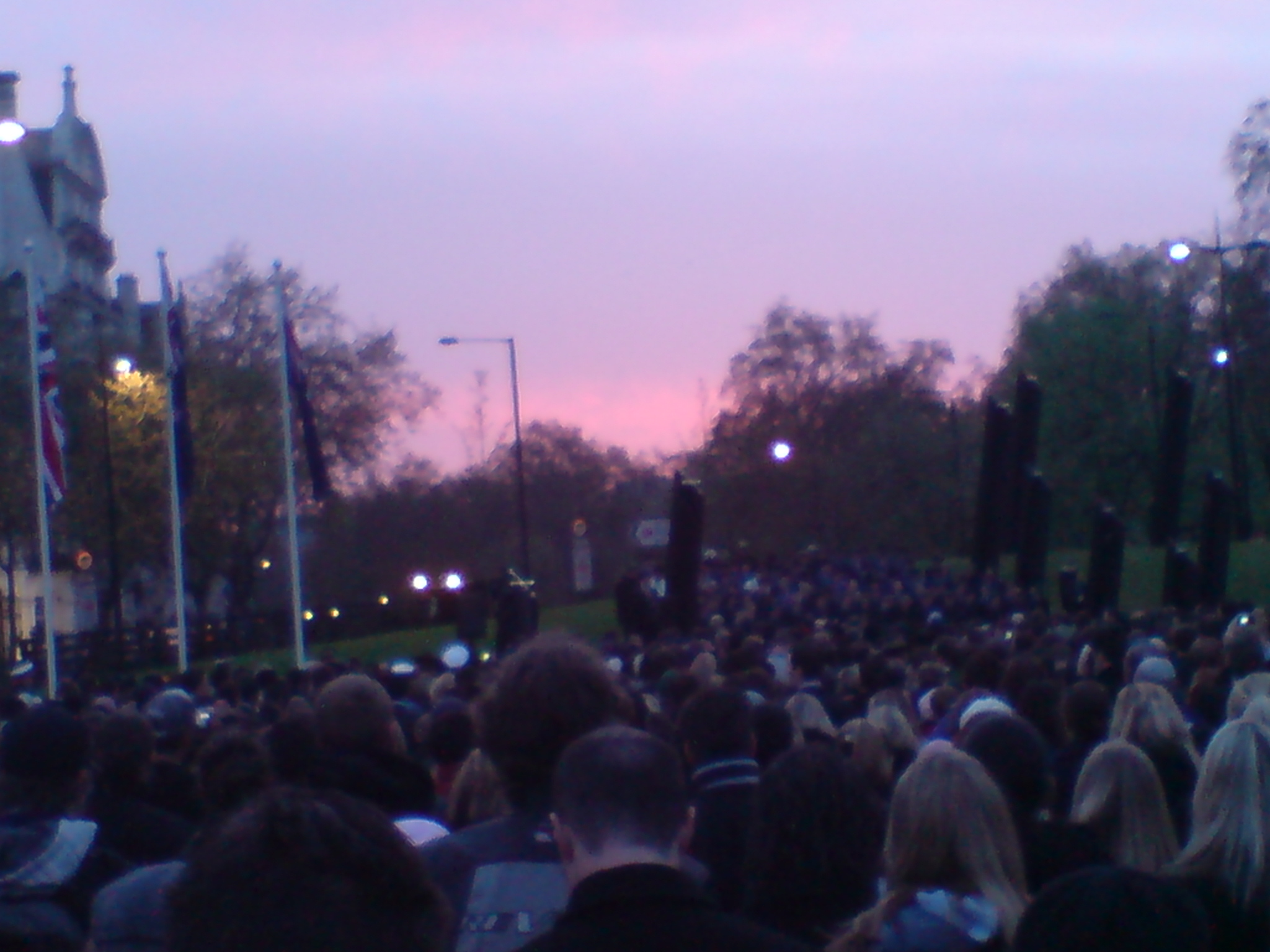
Anzac Day dawn service at the New Zealand Memorial, Hyde Park Corner, London, 25 April 2008

- In London a 5 am dawn service is held, alternating between the Australian War Memorial, and the more recently constructed New Zealand War Memorial, both of which are at Hyde Park Corner. The day is also marked by a 9 am wreath laying ceremony and service at the Gallipoli Memorial in the crypt of St Paul's Cathedral and an 11 am Wreath Laying Ceremony and Parade at The Cenotaph, Whitehall, both of which are attended by official representatives and veterans associations of Australia, New Zealand, the United Kingdom and other countries. The wreath laying ceremony at the cenotaph is directly followed by a service of commemoration and thanksgiving at Westminster Abbey. The dawn service, ceremony at the cenotaph and the service of commemoration and thanksgiving are usually attended by a member of the Royal Family representing the monarch, and by the high commissioners of Australia and New Zealand. Anzac Day has been officially observed in London since 1916, when King George V and Queen Mary attended the first commemorative service at the abbey.
- In Tetbury, Gloucestershire, England, a March is held on the nearest Sunday to Anzac Day. A march followed by a service is held in Leighterton Cemetery, which has several war graves of servicemen from Australia and New Zealand. Veterans and cadets from the local ATC squadron attend.
- In Oxford, Oxfordshire, England, an Anzac Day service is organised by the Oxford University Australia New Zealand Society. In 2015 the service was held at the University Church on 25 April, followed by dinner in Somerville College Hall. Representatives of the Australian and New Zealand high commissions attend and Australian, New Zealand, and Turkish students are all involved in the service.
- A service of remembrance to commemorate Anzac Day and Gallipoli is held at the National Memorial Arboretum in Alrewas, Staffordshire. This commences with a service in the chapel followed by wreath laying at the Gallipoli memorial.

=== United States ===
- At the Los Angeles National Cemetery, the New Zealand and Australian consulates-general host the service, held at 9 am. The largest expatriate community of New Zealanders and Australians were in Southern California as at 2001.
- In San Francisco, there is an 11 am service at the Log Cabin in the Presidio on the Sunday nearest 25 April. Dignitaries from Australia, New Zealand, Turkey, the United States and the United Kingdom attend. It is followed by a BBQ picnic.
- In Santa Barbara, California, Anzac Day is remembered by the expatriate Australian and New Zealand communities. In the absence of an official World War I remembrance, several dignitaries from many countries including Australia, New Zealand and the US attend an 11.11 am morning service held at the Elings Park Veteran's Memorial Walk on 25 April of each year.
- In New York City, a memorial is hosted by the Australian and New Zealand Consuls-General at the Vietnam Veterans Plaza, and a commemorative service is held on the nearest Sunday to Anzac Day in the roof garden of the British Empire Building in Rockefeller Center; it is an annual tradition that has been held at this locale since 1950.
- In Washington, D.C., Australian and New Zealand servicemen and women observe Anzac Day at a dawn service at the Korean War Veterans Memorial on 25 April and there is also a Washington National Cathedral commemorative service.
- In Honolulu the Marine Corps hosts an Anzac Day ceremony at the National Memorial Cemetery of the Pacific, known as The Punchbowl.
- In Fort Novosel (formerly Fort Rucker), a dawn service is held on 25 April led by the senior Australian liaison officer at the fort's memorial garden adjacent to the aviation museum.
- Commemoration services are also held at Bloomington (Indiana), Boston, Chicago, Fort Lauderdale, Fort Leonard Wood, Houston, Miami, Milwaukee, Minneapolis, San Diego and Seattle.

== Commercialisation ==
From the beginning, there has been concern to protect the Anzac tradition from inappropriate use. In Australia, use of the word Anzac is regulated under the Protection of Word "Anzac" Act 1920. The Protection of Word 'Anzac' Regulations 1921 state that: "no person may use the word 'Anzac', or any word resembling it, in connection with any trade, business, calling or profession or in connection with any entertainment or any lottery or art union or as the name or part of a name of any private residence, boat, vehicle of charitable or other institution, or other institution, or any building without the authority of the Minister for Veterans' Affairs". The maximum penalty is 12 months imprisonment, or $10,200 for a person and $51,000 for a corporation.

Over recent years, some historians and commentators have raised concerns over what they see as the increasing commercialisation of Anzac Day. In 2015, historian Carolyn Holbrook stated that companies were seeking to associate themselves with Anzac Day as "Anzac is the most potent and popular brand going around in Australia today." Questionable Anzac marketing campaigns included Woolworths' Fresh in Our Memories campaign in 2015, which provoked a strong public backlash. According to Holbrook, Anzac Day is more sacred than Easter or Christmas to many. Historian professor Joan Beaumont, researcher Jo Hawkins and historical commentator David Stephens have argued that the federal government has not been sufficiently enforcing regulations which limit the extent to which companies can refer to Anzac Day, or use the word Anzac, in their marketing. There has been widespread public opposition to the more blatant attempts to commercialise Anzac Day, which has led to some products being withdrawn from sale. Many of the products associated with the centenary of the Gallipoli landings were also commercial failures.

A notable exception is the manufacture and sale of the Anzac biscuit, originally home made to published recipes from about 1920, and for many decades manufactured commercially for retail sale in both Australia and New Zealand. Commercial manufacture and sale of the biscuits is explicitly exempted from restrictions on the use of the word Anzac.

== Criticism of some commemorations ==
For decades, there have been concerns that the participation of young people in Anzac Day events has injected a carnival element into what is traditionally a solemn occasion. The change was highlighted by a rock concert-style performance at the 2005 Anzac Cove commemoration during which attendees drank and slept between headstones. After the event the site was left strewn with rubbish. In 2013, historian Jonathan King said that "escalating commercial pressures threaten to turn the centenary [of the landing at Gallipoli] into a Big Day Out".

Digital change has been the focus of recent concern. The centenary commemoration of Anzac and the First World War has coincided with the emergence of a mature internet and comprehensive use of social media. According to Tom Sear, a new era of "digital commemoration" of Anzac Day has begun. Anzac Day selfies, memes, virtual reality Anzac avatars, Facebook posts and tweeting are part of a new participative, and immersive experience of the day. Digital media have personalised the experience of Anzac Day, focusing on sharing the activities online. In a time when the line between being online and offline is increasingly blurred, there has been a turn towards commemorative activities that seek to generate empathy and connection between contemporary audiences and historical subjects through digital media. Leading news organisations such as the ABC and News Corp live tweeted and made Facebook posts about the original Anzac landings in 2015. These online forums, and their capacity for personalised feedback, have disquieted some historians, who are concerned about the distance, solemnity and critical perspective of traditional Anzac Day commemorations being lost. Equally others emphasise how, particularly young people, using these technologies of the present, play a role in connecting wider communities of Anzac Day commemorators.

== Criticism of Anzac Day ==
At its inception, Anzac Day faced criticism from the Australian labour movement, and in the country at large, there has been opposition to political exploitation of what was seen as a day of mourning. One controversy occurred in 1960 with the publication of Alan Seymour's classic play, The One Day of the Year, which dramatised the growing social divide in Australia and the questioning of old values. In the play, Anzac Day is critiqued by the central character, Hughie, as a day of drunken debauchery by returned soldiers and as a day when questions of what it means to be loyal to a nation or empire must be raised. The play was scheduled to be performed at the inaugural Adelaide Festival of Arts, but after complaints from the Returned Services League, the governors of the festival refused permission for this to occur.

Throughout the 1960s and 1970s, related to Australia's involvement in the Vietnam war and other issues, Anzac Day not only sank in popularity but was the focus for the expression of much dissent. (See § Decline in popularity.)

Anzac Day has been criticised in recent years by a number of Australians and New Zealanders, as, for example, "a day that obscures the politics of war and discourages political dissent". In October 2008, former Australian prime minister Paul Keating stated that he believes it is misguided for people to gather each year at Anzac Cove to commemorate the landing at Gallipoli, because it is "utter and complete nonsense" to suggest that the nation was "born again or even, redeemed there". Kevin Rudd, the Australian prime minister at the time, rejected Keating's views, saying the Gallipoli campaign is "part of our national consciousness, it's part of our national psyche, it's part of our national identity, and I, for one, as Prime Minister of the country, am absolutely proud of it".

Some critics have suggested that the revival in public interest in Anzac Day amongst the young results from the fact that younger Australians have not themselves experienced war. Critics see the revival as part of a rise of unreflective nationalism in Australia which was particularly fostered by the then Australian prime minister John Howard. Some historians believe Anzac Day events are now on the decline, although it is likely there will continue to be smaller dawn services and official events in the future. Martin Crotty thought that perhaps it was now a ritual for older, traditional Australians, with old values of mateship and loyalty and even as a "reaction against globalisation"; however, Carolyn Holbrook disagrees, arguing that young people are responsible for the resurgence, and among older people there is a big group of sceptics, Baby Boomers who were influenced by Vietnam War protests.

Other criticisms have revolved around a perceived overzealousness in Australian attachment to the event, either from participants unaware of the loss or when the focus is at the expense of remembrance of the contribution of New Zealand. In 2005, John Howard was criticised for shunning the New Zealand Anzac ceremony at Gallipoli, preferring instead to spend his morning at a barbecue on the beach with Australian soldiers. In 2009, New Zealand historians noted that some Australian children were unaware that New Zealand was a part of ANZAC. In 2012, a New Zealand journalist caused controversy following comments that Australian World War I soldiers were bludgers and thieves.

== See also ==
- Anzac Day in Queensland
- ANZAC Field of Remembrance
- Australian Turkish Friendship Memorial
- Military history of Australia
- Military history of New Zealand
