= Walter Parker (Australian soldier) =

Australian centenarian

- Born: 11 August 1894; Brookvale, New South Wales
- Died: 22 January 2000 (aged 105); Melbourne
- Military career
- Allegiance: Australia
- Branch: Australian Army; Australian Imperial Force (AIF) – 20th Battalion, 4th Reinforcements
- Service years: 1915–1919
- Nickname: Wal
- Conflicts: World War I; Battle of Gallipoli; Battle of Pozières
- Awards: 1914-15 Star; British War Medal; Victory Medal; 80th Anniversary Armistice Remembrance Medal; Centenary Medal; Legion d'Honneur (France)
- Other work: store worker at Glen Innes, New South Wales

Walter Parker (11 August 1894 – 22 January 2000) was an Australian soldier and the third last surviving veteran of the Australian and New Zealand Army Corps (ANZAC) who served in World War I.

== ANZAC soldier ==
Parker, one of eight children pre-war plans for a career in Sydney as a commercial art printer was set aside when he enlisted in the Australian Imperial Force (AIF) at age 20. His father had signed his enlistment on the condition he was not sent to New Guinea, as he feared the malaria Parker who initially thought he was being sent to England arrived at the Battle of Gallipoli in November 1915 with the 20th Battalion, 4th Reinforcements. He was tasked with carrying ammunition and water through the trenches to the front. After his evacuation from Turkey, he fought in France. He was shot in the arm at Pozières; and then he was invalided to England.

== Civilian life ==
After returning to Australia, Parker was married to Amy McPhail for 52 years married and had two children, a son and a daughter. His son Earle was killed in World War II. He was survived by three grandchildren and two great-granddaughters.

== Australian legends ==
In 2000, Parker was recognized with Roy Longmore and Alec Campbell as one of the "Australian Legends". His name and photograph were part of an annual series of commemorative postage stamps issued by Australia Post since 1997. The stamps honour living Australians "who have made lifetime contributions to the development of Australia's national identity and character". Parker did not live to fully enjoy this accolade, as he died at a nursing home in Melbourne the day after the stamp was officially issued.

Parker's 45-cent Legend stamp displays the soldier's portrait as a young man, photographed just prior to his departure for Gallipoli. Formal photographs of the other two ANZAC centenarians complete this stamp set, titled The Last ANZACS. In addition, a fourth stamp features the 1914–15 star medal which was presented to all those who fought in campaigns during those war years. These stamps, designed by Cathleen Cram of the Australia Post Design Studio, commemorate the story of events and people shaping contemporary Australia. The Parker stamp honours him as an individual and as a representative of all the soldiers at Gallipoli whose actions affected Australia's evolving self-image.

== Medals and honours ==

- 1914-15 Star
- British War Medal
- Victory Medal (UK)
- 80th Anniversary Armistice Remembrance Medal, 1999 (Australia).
- Centenary Medal (Australia)
- Australia Post Australian Legends Award, 2000.
- Legion d'Honneur, 1998 (France).

== See also ==
- Alec Campbell, last living Anzac
- Roy Longmore, next to last living Anzac
