= Australian Legends =

The Australian Legends is an annual series of commemorative postage stamps issued by Australia Post since 1997. The stamps commemorate living Australians who have made lifetime contributions to the development of the Commonwealth's national identity and character. Prior to 1997, the only living persons who could appear on Australian stamps were members of the British royal family, with the exception of Gwoya Tjungurrayi in 1950.

As examples of Australian graphic art, the stamps are designed to tell the story of events and personalities that shaped contemporary Australia. Each becomes part of a collective Australian memory which reflects Australian values and documents the development of Australia's national identity.

In addition to the philatelic commemoration, the honour is also known as the Australia Post Australian Legends Award.

Russell Crowe appears in the series despite not holding Australian citizenship.
