= 80th Anniversary Armistice Remembrance Medal =

- Medal
- Type: Medal
- Awarded for: The 80th anniversary of the Armistice
- Presented by: Australia
- Eligibility: Surviving World War I veterans
- Clasps: None
- Status: Ceased
- Established: 27 January 1999

Highlights
- Total: 71
- Ribbon

Order of Wear
- Next (higher): King Charles III Coronation Medal
- Next (lower): Australian Sports Medal

The 80th Anniversary Armistice Remembrance Medal was a commemorative medal made to commemorate the 80th anniversary of the Armistice marking the end of World War I. Each of the 71 surviving Australian First World War veterans were presented with the medal for Anzac Day 1999. It is the first commemorative medal in the Australian Honours System.

A total of 71 medals were issued prior to Anzac Day (25 April) 1999, with the medal being minted in record time following its establishment in January 1999.

== Description ==
- The 80th Anniversary Armistice Remembrance Medal is a nickel-silver medal ensigned with the Crown of King George V (sovereign at the time of World War I). The obverse has a raised central replica of the Bullecourt Digger. The words 80th Anniversary Armistice Remembrance Medal are on the perimeter of the medal.
- The reverse of the medal shows the Federation Star over the central inscription 'Lest We Forget' surrounded by two sprays of golden wattle that cross at the base.
- The medal ribbon has a central black stripe flanked by red and black stripes. Red and black are the colours of the Flanders poppy worn as a mark of respect on Remembrance Day.

== See also ==
- Australian Honours Order of Precedence
