= Percy Black =

Australian soldier (1877–1917)

Percy Charles Herbert Black
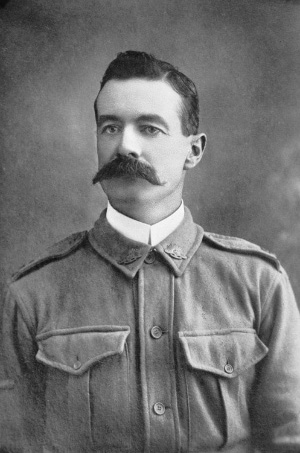
- Percy Black c.1914
- Born: 12 December 1877; Beremboke, Victoria, Australia
- Died: 11 April 1917 (aged 39); Bullecourt, France
- Military career
- Allegiance: Australia
- Branch: Australian Imperial Force
- Service years: 1914–1917
- Rank: Major
- Unit: 16th Battalion
- Conflicts: First World War; Gallipoli Campaign; Western Front; Battle of the Somme; Battle of Pozières; Battle of Mouquet Farm; First Battle of Bullecourt †
- Awards: Distinguished Service Order; Distinguished Conduct Medal; Mentioned in Despatches (3); Croix de guerre (France)

Percy Charles Herbert Black, DSO, DCM (12 December 1877 – 11 April 1917) was a decorated Australian soldier who served with the Australian Imperial Force in the First World War.

== Early life ==
Black was born in Beremboke, near Bacchus Marsh, Victoria, the eleventh child of William and Anne (née Longmore), farmers originally from Antrim, Ireland. He trained as a carpenter before moving to Western Australia as a prospector in the Western Australian gold rush.

== First World War ==
In Western Australia, Black, aged 36, enlisted as a private in the Australian Imperial Force (1st AIF) in 1914. His poor teeth saw him accepted "subject to extraction of stumps". He started his military career at Blackboy Hill Camp, near Perth, where he first met Harry Murray. Black and Murray, who would become the most decorated Australian soldier in the war, trained together on the Maxim Gun and became firm friends. Black's instructor at the camp claimed Black was the best gunner he had come across.

Black was dispatched to Egypt with the 16th Battalion. Black saw action during the Gallipoli Campaign, taking part in the landing on 25 April 1915 (ANZAC Day). Black, with his good friend, Harry Murray, formed one of the 16th Battalion's two machine gun teams. In May he was awarded the Distinguished Conduct Medal and commissioned in the field as a second lieutenant. In August, before leaving Gallipoli, Black was Mentioned in Despatches (for actions prior to 20 May), and promoted to captain.

Black was promoted to major in 1916, and was sent with his battalion to the Western Front. On 12 July he was again Mentioned in Despatches, for actions shortly before the withdrawal from Gallipoli. In France, Black fought at Pozières and Mouquet Farm. At Mouquet Farm, which the Germans had turned into a fortress, Black and the 16th Battalion battled through dugouts and cellars. The Australians were unable to hold the fortress, a determined counter-attack threw the Australians back to their start lines. Black was wounded—shot in the neck—and the severity of wound required specialist treatment in London.

While in London, Black was awarded the Distinguished Service Order (DSO) and the French Croix de guerre for his actions at Pozières and Mouquet Farm. The citation for his DSO was published in a supplement to the London Gazette on 14 November 1916 and read:

Maj. Percy Black, Inf. For conspicuous gallantry during operations. He led his company over "No Man's Land" against an enemy's [sic] strong point, which he captured and consolidated under very difficult circumstances, and under heavy artillery and machine gun fire. On a subsequent occasion he did similar fine work.

On day-leave from hospital, Black went sightseeing around London with a friend. Dodging the busy traffic around Piccadilly Circus, Black drolly remarked to his companion, "I’ll be glad to get back to the battalion, mate. A man’s not safe here!" He was able to return to his battalion in early 1917.

Black was killed at the First Battle of Bullecourt on 11 April 1917 while commanding the right flank of his battalion. His battalion was exposed to uncut wire and machine gun fire after a tank offensive failed to clear a passage. Black, leading his men forward, yelled "Come on boys, bugger the tanks!" He captured the first trenches before he was shot in the head while pressing on towards the support line. Knowing the attack would be difficult, Black said to his commanding officer beforehand "Well, goodbye Colonel. I mayn't come back but we will take the Hindenburg Line".

Black is commemorated on the Villers-Bretonneux Memorial; his body was never found despite a determined search by his friend Murray. However, Australian press reports on 6 August 2010 indicate that new documentary evidence of a possible burial place has recently been uncovered. A group led by Lambis Englezos—who began the work that led to the recovery of over 200 men missing after the Battle of Fromelles, and reinterred at the new Fromelles (Pheasant Wood) Military Cemetery earlier in 2010—found eyewitness reports from Allied prisoners of war who were ordered by the Germans to bury the men in shell holes after the Battle of Bullecourt. The group is now trying to obtain funding for ground-penetrating radar surveys of the area to locate the graves. Since 2012, Black is honoured in a part of the new Bullecourt 1917, Jean and Denise Letaille museum.

== Personality ==
Black was seen as a gentleman but prospecting life had hardened him. Harry Murray said that Black was "as gentle of a Sister of Mercy", however Murray also relayed the story about a fight between Black and a boxer when Black was prospecting in Western Australia. While getting beaten early, Black persisted and in the end his friends had to pull him off the boxer, who spent a month in hospital.

While Black was renowned for his courage, Murray claimed that "Percy never went berserk and never sought death" and "had all the fear of the unknown". He was described by the Australian war historian C. E. W Bean as "the greatest fighting soldier in the A.I.F.", while Murray, himself a recipient of the Victoria Cross, called Black "the bravest and coolest of all the brave men I know".
