= Harry Murray =

Recipient of the Victoria Cross

Harry Murray VC, CMG, DSO & Bar, DCM
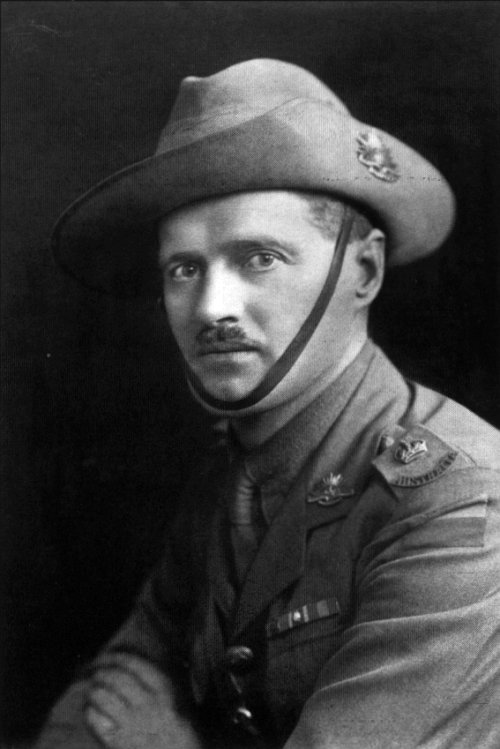
- Major Harry Murray, November 1917
- Born: 1 December 1880; Evandale, Tasmania
- Died: 7 January 1966 (aged 85); Miles, Queensland
- Military career
- Allegiance: Australia
- Branch: Citizen Military Forces; Australian Imperial Force; Second Australian Imperial Force
- Service years: 1902–1908; 1914–1920; 1939–1944
- Rank: Lieutenant colonel
- Nickname: "Mad Harry"
- Commands: 23rd Queensland Regiment (1942–44); 26th Battalion (1939–42); 4th Machine Gun Battalion (1918–19)
- Conflicts: First World War; Gallipoli Campaign; Western Front; Battle of the Somme; Battle of Mouquet Farm; Battle of Passchendaele; Battle of Hamel; Battle of Amiens; Battle of St Quentin Canal; Second World War
- Awards: Victoria Cross; Companion of the Order of St Michael and St George; Companion of the Distinguished Service Order & Bar; Distinguished Conduct Medal; Mentioned in Despatches (4); Croix de guerre (France)
- Other work: Farmer

Henry William Murray, VC, CMG, DSO & Bar, DCM (1 December 1880 – 7 January 1966) was an Australian grazier, soldier, and a recipient of the Victoria Cross, the highest decoration for gallantry "in the face of the enemy" that can be awarded to members of the British and Commonwealth armed forces. Decorated several times throughout his service in the First World War, Murray rose from the rank of private to lieutenant colonel in three and a half years. He is often described as the most highly decorated infantry soldier of the British Empire during the First World War.

Born in Tasmania, Murray worked as a farmer, courier and timber cutter before enlisting in September 1914. Assigned to a machine gun crew, he served during the Gallipoli Campaign, where he was awarded the Distinguished Conduct Medal before the withdrawal from the peninsula. He was later transferred along with the rest of his battalion to France for service on the Western Front, where he was appointed a Companion of the Distinguished Service Order during the Battle of the Somme. In February 1917, Murray commanded a company during the battalion's attack on the German position of Stormy Trench. During the engagement, the company was able to capture the position and repulse three fierce counter-attacks, with Murray often leading bayonet and bombing charges himself. For his actions during the battle, Murray was awarded the Victoria Cross. Soon after his Victoria Cross action, he was promoted to major and earned a Bar to his Distinguished Service Order insignia during an attack on the Hindenburg Line near Bullecourt. Promoted to lieutenant colonel in early 1918, he assumed command of the 4th Machine Gun Battalion, where he would remain until the end of the war.

Returning to Australia in 1920, Murray eventually settled in Queensland, where he purchased the grazing farm that would be his home for the remainder of his life. Re-enlisting for service in the Second World War, he was appointed as commanding officer of the 26th (Militia) Battalion. Taking his discharge in 1944, Murray returned to his farm and died in 1966 at the age of 85.

== Early life ==
Murray was born at Clairville, near Evandale, Tasmania, on 1 December 1880, (Note: There has been much confusion over Murray's date of birth, which seems to have been caused by the man himself. Most publications claim his birth as 1 December 1884, which is the date he placed on his enlistment forms for the First World War and supplied to historian Charles Bean. Upon his enlistment for the Second World War, he gave his year of birth as 1885, and also placed differing years on his marriage certificates and the birth certificates for his children. However, according to Franki & Slatyer 2003, p. 1 his birth certificate states 1 December 1880.) the eighth of nine children of Edward Kennedy Murray, a farmer, and his wife Clarissa, née Littler. Descended from convicts on his father's side, Murray was baptised on 23 November 1885, and attended Evandale State School. When he was fourteen years of age, his parents withdrew him from school to work on the family farm. However, his mother continued his education, placing emphasis on English. The family later moved to Northcote, near St Leonards, where Edward Murray died in 1904. Harry Murray joined the Launceston Volunteer Artillery Corps in 1902, serving until 1908, when he migrated to Western Australia where his two older brothers had previously settled.

Murray initially worked on his brother's wheat farm, before becoming a courier for a mining company at Kookynie, transporting gold and mail by bicycle or on horseback. He travelled the same track on a fortnightly basis, gaining a reputation for being a crack shot with a .32 carbine that he carried. At the time of his enlistment in 1914, Murray was working near Manjimup, in the south west of Western Australia, employing timber cutters for the railways.

== First World War ==
=== Enlistment and training ===
Murray enlisted in the Australian Imperial Force (AIF) in Perth on 30 September 1914. He declined the offer of a commission, and was posted as a private to A Company of the newly formed 16th Battalion, 4th Brigade. Appointed to one of the unit's two machine gun crews, he was sent to Blackboy Hill Camp for training, where he became the gun No. 2, whose job it was to feed ammunition belts through the gun; Percy Black was No. 1 and the pair soon became firm friends.

On 21 November, the battalion entrained for Fremantle, boarding troopships headed for Melbourne; it was there that the four battalions combined to form the 4th Brigade under the command of Colonel John Monash. After completing their basic training in Victoria, the brigade left Port Melbourne aboard Troopship A40, Ceramic on 26 December. After a brief stop at Albany, Western Australia, they arrived in Egypt in early February 1915. The brigade marched from Alexandria to Heliopolis as part of the New Zealand and Australian Division of Major General Alexander Godley.

=== Gallipoli ===
The Allied commanders planned to defeat Turkey and force a supply route through to Russia via the Bosporus and the Black Sea. As such they planned a land invasion on the Gallipoli Peninsula. On the afternoon of 25 April 1915, Murray's 16th Battalion landed at Ari Burnu, Gallipoli. Setting their machine gun on Pope's Hill, Black and Murray fired their gun throughout the afternoon and into the night. The following day, the battalion's two machine gun crews sniped at the Turkish soldiers on Russell's Top, and Murray and his gunner continued fighting during the counterattack on 26–27 April, despite being wounded.

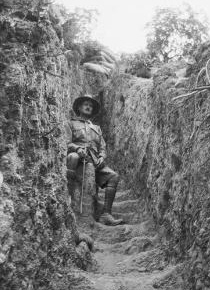
Second Lieutenant Murray, Gallipoli 1915

Promoted to lance corporal on 12 May, Murray was evacuated to Egypt eighteen days later, due to a gunshot wound to his right knee. His knee soon stiffened and he was posted to a hospital ship set to return to Australia. Murray, however, had other ideas and made his way to the wharf at Alexandria where he boarded a transport bound for Gallipoli. Arriving at the peninsula on 3 July, both Murray and Black received the Distinguished Conduct Medal for their actions between 9–31 May, during which time they tirelessly manned their machine gun, "inflict[ing] serious losses upon the enemy". Murray was again wounded on 8 August when the machine gun section of the 4th Brigade covered the withdrawal after the attack on Hill 971. On 13 August, he was promoted to sergeant, commissioned as a second lieutenant and transferred to the 13th Battalion.

Murray was again evacuated to Egypt on 26 September due to dysentery. After nearly six weeks in the 2nd Australian General Hospital at Ghezireh, he rejoined the 13th Battalion at Gallipoli on 7 December, before leaving for the last time in the Allied evacuation later that month.

Returning to Egypt, the AIF expanded and was reorganised; the 13th Battalion was split and provided experienced soldiers for the 45th Battalion, while the 4th Brigade was combined with the 12th and 13th Brigades to form the 4th Australian Division. Murray was promoted to lieutenant on 20 January 1916, and then to captain on 1 March.

=== Western Front: June 1916 to April 1917 ===
On 1 June 1916, the 13th Battalion embarked at Alexandria for Marseille, France, before being deployed to the Western Front. In mid-June, the battalion moved into trenches at Bois Grenier near Armentières, and on 13 July they relocated to Bailleul, in time for the Battle of the Somme.

On 29 August, Murray commanded A Company—which consisted of fewer than one hundred men—in a successful attack that captured Mouquet Farm under heavy fire. His men repelled four German counterattacks before he ordered them to withdraw. He remained in command until the next morning, when he fainted from loss of blood from two wounds he had sustained during the action. Murray was appointed a Companion of the Distinguished Service Order (DSO) for his service during the action, an event that was published in a supplement of The London Gazette dated 14 November 1916. He was later evacuated to England aboard the hospital ship Asturias, and admitted to the 4th General Hospital, London, where he was to share a ward with Albert Jacka and Percy Black, who were recovering from wounds received at Poziéres and Mouquet Farm respectively. After nearly six weeks of recuperation, he returned to the 13th Battalion in France on 19 October.

Following a period of patrols and trench raids, the 13th was relieved by the 5th Battalion on 6 December, and marched back to Ribemont, where Murray was granted leave to England. On 4 January 1917, he was Mentioned in Despatches. The battalion returned to the front in February, relieving the 15th Battalion at Gueudecourt. On 4 February, the battalion's commanding officer received the order to attack Stormy Trench; it was during this action that Murray would earn his Victoria Cross (VC).

On the night of 4–5 February 1917, the 13th Battalion—with Murray commanding A Company—attacked the German position at Stormy Trench. Preceded by a heavy artillery barrage, A Company seized the right of the position after overcoming stiff resistance, consolidating their gains by setting up a makeshift barricade. The Germans counterattacked, prompting Murray to send an SOS signal to the artillery officer, calling for more support. Although repulsed, the Germans counterattacked twice more. On the third attack, Murray organised a twenty-man grenade bombing party and led them in a charge against their attackers, pushing them back to their original start line. On another occasion when the company lost some ground, Murray rallied his men and retook it. Between midnight and 03:00, the company maintained spasmodic bombing, repelling further assaults with the aid of artillery support. By 20:00 on 5 February, the 16th Battalion relieved Murray's company, which had only 48 survivors from the 140 who had begun the attack.

The full citation for Murray's VC appeared in a supplement to The London Gazette on 10 March 1917, reading:

War Office, 10th March, 1917

His Majesty the KING has been graciously pleased to approve of the award of the Victoria Cross to the undermentioned Officer and Non-Commissioned Officer: –

Capt. Henry William Murray, D.S.O., Aus. infy.

For most conspicuous bravery when in command of the right flank company in attack. He led his company to the assault with great skill and courage, and the position was quickly captured. Fighting of a very severe nature followed, and three heavy counter-attacks were beaten back, these successes being due to Captain Murray's wonderful work.

Throughout the night his company suffered heavy casualties through concentrated enemy shell fire, and on one occasion gave ground for a short way. This gallant officer rallied his command and saved the situation by sheer valour.

He made his presence felt throughout the line, encouraging his men, heading bombing parties, leading bayonet charges, and carrying wounded to places of safety.

His magnificent example inspired his men throughout.

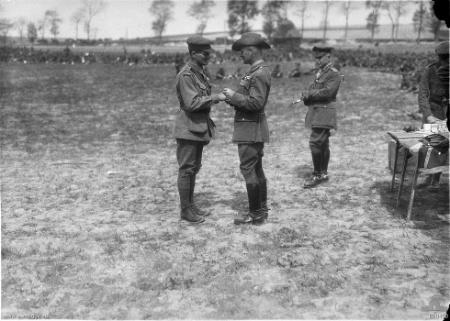
Major Murray being presented with a Bar to his DSO by General Sir William Birdwood, commanding the Australian Corps, 1917.

In April 1917, the battalion relocated to Bullecourt in preparation for an attack on the Hindenburg Line. On the night of 11 April, seven battalions of the 4th Australian Division assembled for the advance, which was launched at 04:30. Murray's company seized a section of German trench, but were quickly isolated. By 07:00, ammunition was running low and casualties were high. Murray sent for artillery support, but conflicting messages meant that it was not provided, so the Australians were forced to withdraw. During the action, the 4th Division lost 2,339 of the 3,000 men that it had committed, with 1170 captured as prisoners of war. Among the dead was Percy Black, who had been killed while trying to find a gap in the barbwire surrounding the German trenches. Murray was awarded a Bar to his DSO for his efforts during the battle, and was promoted to temporary major. He was later informed by General Birdwood that had the attack at Bullecourt been successful, he would have instead been awarded a Bar to his VC.

=== Western Front: April 1917 to repatriation, March 1920 ===
After Bullecourt, the 4th Brigade withdrew to Ribemont, where reinforcements brought it up to strength. During this period, Murray oversaw musketry training before being granted convalescent leave to London in May. While in the capital, he was decorated with his Victoria Cross and Distinguished Service Order by King George V in Hyde Park on 2 June 1917. Promoted major on 12 July, he rejoined his battalion later in the month, and during the 4th Brigade's advance to the Hindenburg Line over subsequent months, was involved in actions at Messines, Ploegstreert Wood, Menin Road, Polygon Wood, Broodseinde, Poelcappelle and Passchendaele. For his actions at Passchendaele, Murray garnered a mention in Field Marshal Sir Douglas Haig's dispatch of 7 November 1917.

Following Passchendaele, the 4th Brigade spent three months in reserve. Murray became second in command of the 13th Battalion, frequently assuming temporary command of the unit while the commanding officer was absent. Granted leave to Paris from 12 January to 2 February 1918, he was promoted to temporary lieutenant colonel on 15 March and assumed command of the 4th Machine Gun Battalion. Commanding the unit during the German spring offensive, Murray's rank was confirmed on 24 May.

On 25 June, Murray attended a conference at 4th Divisional Headquarters to discuss a proposed attack on Hamel. Having submitted a plan for the use of machine guns in the battle, five extra sections were attached to Murray's battalion. The battle commenced on 4 July, and over the period of two days, the 4th Machine Gun Battalion fired 373,000 rounds of small arms ammunition, suffering 33 casualties. On 3 August, he attended another divisional conference regarding the planned attack near Amiens scheduled for 8 August. Lieutenant General John Monash's instructions called for several of the 4th Machine Gun Battalion's companies to be moved forward by Mark V tanks, accompanying different units during the battle. At the end of the three-day action, German General Erich Ludendorff described the Allied success as "the black day of the German Army in this war".

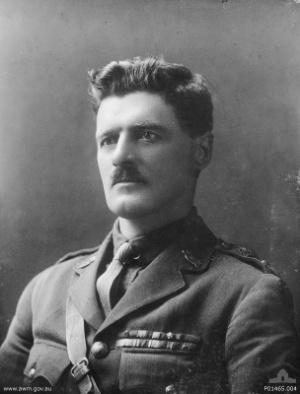
Lieutenant Colonel Harry Murray c. 1920

From 23 September to 3 October 1918, Murray was seconded to the Headquarters of the United States II Corps as a liaison officer with the 27th Division. The 27th Division, along with the 30th Division, had been attached to Lieutenant General Monash's Corps for the assault on the Bellicourt Tunnel of the Hindenburg Line. During his service with the Americans, Murray was recommended for the United States' Distinguished Service Medal by the commander of the 27th, Major General John F. O'Ryan. The Distinguished Service Medal is the highest non-valorous military and civilian decoration of the United States military, and in General O'Ryan's recommendation he stated that Murray's "... knowledge, activity and fearlessness ... assisted materially in the control of the attacking forces".

The battle alongside the Americans was Murray's last of the war, as the Australians were placed in reserve in early October before the signing of the Armistice on 11 November 1918. On 3 January 1919, Murray was awarded the French Croix de guerre for his service as commander of the 4th Machine Gun Battalion from 23 March to 24 April and 2–7 August 1918. On 30 May 1919, he was awarded a Companion of the Order of St Michael and St George for his command of the 4th Machine Gun Battalion, the recommendation of which particularly citing his success during attacks on the Hindenburg Line. Murray's final honour came on 11 July 1919, when he was Mentioned in Despatches for the fourth time, having received his third mention on 31 December 1918.

From June to September 1919, Murray—along with fellow Australian Victoria Cross recipient William Donovan Joynt—led parties of AIF members on a tour of the farming districts of Britain and Denmark to study agricultural methods under the education schemes. After touring through France and Belgium, he left England on 19 November 1919 aboard the Orient Line transport, Ormonde, along with Generals Birdwood and Monash. A month later, a large crowd celebrated the arrival of the two generals and Murray at Victoria Quay in Fremantle. Attempting to evade further fanfare, Murray quietly travelled to northern Tasmania and then to his sister's house in Launceston. He was discharged from the AIF on 9 March 1920.

== Between the wars ==
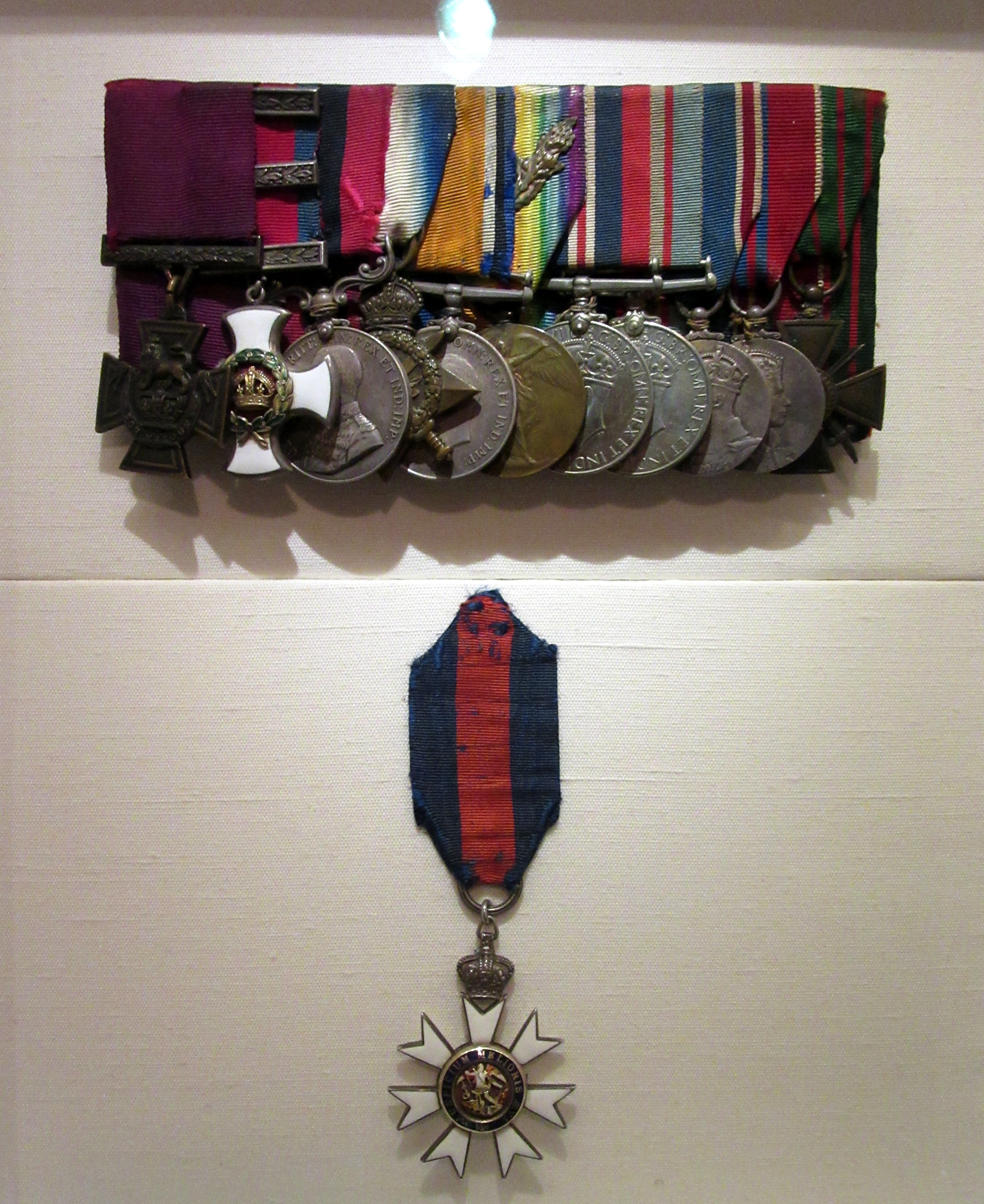
Murray's medal group on display at the Australian War Memorial, Canberra.

After his discharge, Murray moved north, buying a grazing property in south-eastern Queensland. On 13 October 1921, he married estate agent Constance Sophia Cameron at Bollon. The marriage was an unhappy one, and the pair separated in 1925 when Murray went to New Zealand. On 11 November 1927, with Constance Murray as petitioner, a decree nisi with costs against Henry Murray was granted on the grounds of desertion. Nine days later, at the Auckland Registrar's Office, Murray married Ellen Perdon "Nell" Cameron; Constance's niece. The couple returned to Queensland, and in April 1928 Murray bought Glenlyon station, Richmond, a 74,000 acre (29,947 ha) grazing property, where he lived for the rest of his life.

The Murrays had two children. Their son Douglas, born in 1930, was named after Lieutenant Colonel Douglas Grey Marks, the commanding officer of the 13th Battalion from 1917 to 1918. In 1934, Nell gave birth to their second child, a girl named Clementine. Between 1929 and 1939, Murray wrote fifteen articles for Reveille, the magazine of the New South Wales branch of the Returned Sailors and Soldiers Imperial League of Australia (RSL), detailing several of his experiences during the First World War, and praising several of his comrades.

== Second World War and later life ==
On 21 July 1939, with the Second World War looming, Murray volunteered for military service and was appointed as commanding officer of the 26th (Militia) Battalion, 11th Brigade, based in Townsville; he was mobilised for full-time service on 21 October 1941. Murray's second-in-command of the unit during this time was Major Edgar Towner, who had additionally been decorated with the Victoria Cross in 1918. The 26th became a unit of the Second Australian Imperial Force in 1942, and in August Murray was removed from his post by General Sir Thomas Blamey, Commander in Chief Australian Military Forces, on the grounds of his advancing age. He was instead appointed to command the 23rd Queensland Regiment, Volunteer Defence Corps, which he led until his retirement from active duty on 8 February 1944.

With the outbreak of the Korean War in 1950, wool prices soared and Murray earned a large income from wool sales, allowing him to regularly travel across Australia. Taking a trip to Brisbane in 1954, he met Queen Elizabeth II during her Royal Tour of Australia. Despite rarely attending Anzac Day services or functions for Victoria Cross recipients, Murray and his wife travelled to London in 1956 to commemorate the centenary of the Victoria Cross. Following the ceremonies, the Murrays spent five weeks on a motor tour of England and Scotland, before visiting Switzerland and France. However, Murray refused to revisit the battlefields.

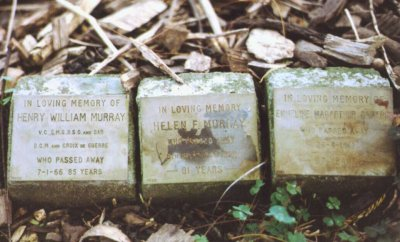
Henry Murray's grave

On 6 January 1966, Nell was driving the family car with Harry as a passenger; they were going to the south coast of Queensland for a holiday. A tyre blew out and the car rolled on the Leichhardt Highway near Condamine. Murray was taken to Miles District Hospital with broken ribs. He had had heart trouble for some time, and the shock of the accident is believed to have caused his death the following day. Murray was interred at Mount Thompson Crematorium with full military honours after a funeral service at St Andrew's Presbyterian Church, Brisbane.

In February 2006, Governor-General Michael Jeffery unveiled a statue of Murray by sculptor Peter Corlett in Evandale, Tasmania. This tribute was facilitated by a small group of volunteers who raised A$85,000 in two years. The Henry Murray ward at Hollywood Private Hospital has been named in his honour.

== Notes ==
Footnotes

Citations
