= Albert Borella =

Recipient of the Victoria Cross

Albert Chalmers Borella VC MM
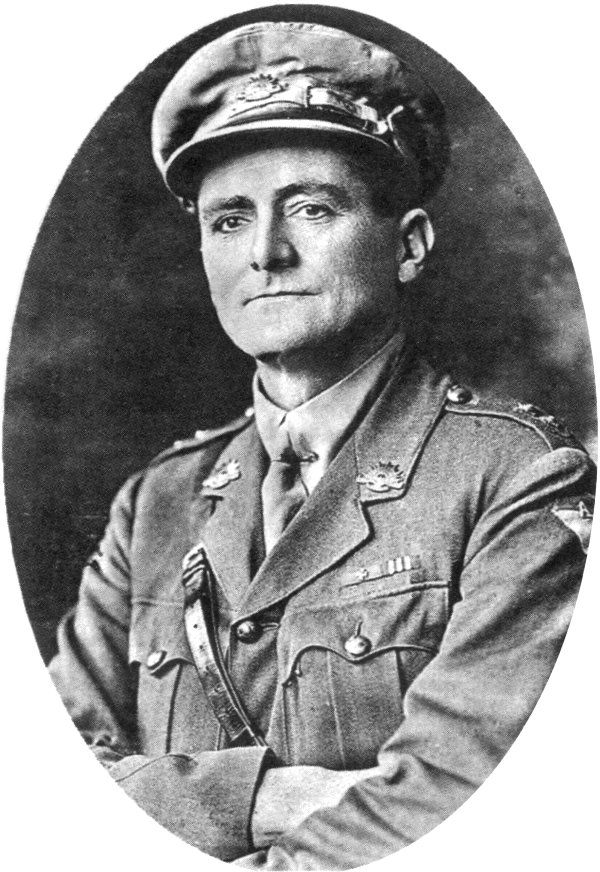
- Lieutenant Albert Borella, 1918
- Born: 7 August 1881; Borung, Victoria
- Died: 7 February 1968 (aged 86); Albury, New South Wales
- Military career
- Allegiance: Australia
- Branch: Australian Imperial Force; Citizens Military Force
- Service years: 1915–1919; 1939–1945
- Rank: Captain
- Units: 26th Battalion
- Conflicts: First World War; Second World War
- Awards: Victoria Cross; Military Medal; Mentioned in Despatches

Albert Chalmers Borella, VC, MM (7 August 1881 – 7 February 1968) was an Australian recipient of the Victoria Cross, the highest award for gallantry in the face of the enemy that can be awarded to British and Commonwealth forces. Born in Victoria, Borella was one of 64 Australians to receive the Victoria Cross for their actions during the First World War, doing so while serving with the 26th Battalion around Villers-Bretonneux in July 1918. After the war, Borella returned to Australia, initially farming a property in Victoria before rejoining the Army during the Second World War and serving in a number of garrison units in Australia. He was demobilised in 1945 and worked as a public servant until he retired in 1956. He died in 1968 at the age of 86.

== Early life ==
Albert Chalmers Borella was born at Borung, Victoria. His parents were Louis Borella and Annie Borella née Chalmers. After attending state schools at Borung and Wychitella, Borella became a farmer, working around Borung and Echuca. He also enlisted as a part-time soldier in the Victorian Rangers, serving for a period of 18 months. He travelled to Melbourne in early 1910 and became a firefighter in the Metropolitan Fire Brigade, remaining in the city until early 1913 when he travelled to the Northern Territory to take up a pastoral lease, working a property on the Daly River until early 1915 when his financial situation forced him to leave the land.

== First World War ==
Borella enlisted in the Australian Imperial Force (AIF) in Townsville, Queensland, on 15 March 1915. He had to go to some effort to do so because at the outbreak of the First World War the military authorities were not accepting volunteers from the Northern Territory. Borella accepted a job as a cook for a survey party in Tennant Creek and in January 1915 he set out for Darwin to volunteer for active service. With Charlie, an Aboriginal man, he walked 140 kilometres (87 mi) and swam across flooded rivers. After borrowing a horse at Powell Creek, just north of Renner Springs, he rode to Katherine where he caught the mail coach to the railhead at Pine Creek. He sailed from Darwin to Townsville on 8 March 1915 with four other men who were among the first 15 volunteers for active service from the Northern Territory.

Initially serving in the ranks as a private, Borella served with the 26th Battalion at Gallipoli from 12 September 1915 until being evacuated with jaundice on 19 November. He did not rejoin his unit until 5 February 1916, and then served on the Western Front in France, being wounded in the Battle of Pozières Heights on 29 July. He achieved promotion from corporal to sergeant and was commissioned as an officer – second lieutenant – on 7 April 1917, and to lieutenant on 28 August 1917. He attended officer training in the United Kingdom. Borella received a Military Medal for conspicuous bravery on 11 May 1917, was Mentioned in Despatches on 1 June 1917, awarded the Victoria Cross on 16 September 1918 for actions in July 1918 during a peaceful penetration operation prior to the start of the Allied Hundred Days Offensive.

His citation for the Victoria Cross, gained in 1918 in Villers-Bretonneux, France, at the age of 37, reads in part:

During the period 17/18 July... Lieutenant Borella, whilst leading his platoon, charged and captured an enemy machine-gun, shooting two gunners. He then led his party, by now reduced to 10 men and two Lewis guns, against a very strongly held trench, using his revolver and later a rifle with great effect and causing many casualties. Two large dug-outs were also bombed and 30 prisoners taken....

He received his VC at Sandringham from King George V. Three of Borella's brothers also served during the war: Charles and James in the 7th Battalion, and Rex in the 8th Light Horse. All survived and returned to Australia.

== Later life ==
At the end of the war Borella was invalided back to Australia, arriving in Melbourne on New Year's Day 1919. From 1920, Borella began farming on a soldier settlement block at Hensley Park, near Hamilton in Victoria. In 1924, he stood for the seat of Dundas in the Victorian Legislative Assembly as the National Party candidate, but was defeated. On 16 August 1928, he married Elsie Jane Love, with whom he would later have four sons.

In late 1939, Borella changed his surname by deed poll to "Chalmers-Borella" in honour of his late mother, who had died when he was four years old. Borella enlisted in the Second World War, and served in Australia from October 1939 to May 1945, obtaining the rank of captain. He initially served in the 12th Australian Garrison Battalion until July 1941 when he was posted to the Prisoner of War Group, based at Rushworth, Victoria, before being posted to the 51st Garrison Company, based at Myrtleford, Victoria.

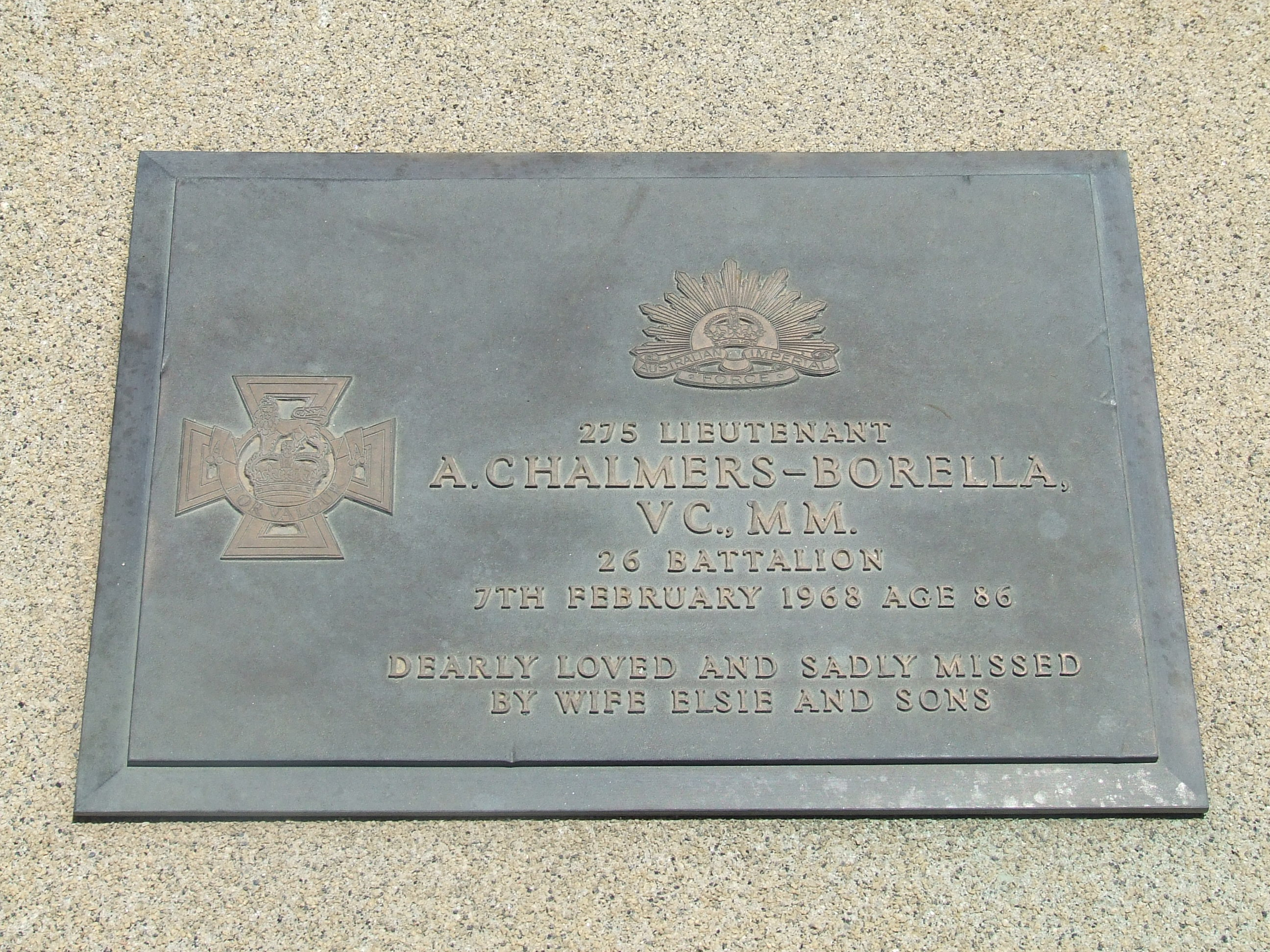
Albert Borella's grave at the Presbyterian Cemetery, North Albury

After being demobilised, Borella moved to Albury, New South Wales, working there as a public servant in the Commonwealth Department of Supply and Shipping, serving in the role of inspector of dangerous cargoes until he retired in 1956. Borella died on 7 February 1968 and was buried at the Presbyterian Cemetery, North Albury, New South Wales. His wife and two of their children survived him. A plaque was unveiled in Jingili, Northern Territory, in 1968, commemorating Borella. A street in Albury was renamed Borella Road and a plaque placed on a nearby memorial in 1977. His Victoria Cross is privately held.

== Borella Ride ==
In August 2014, the Northern Territory Government announced it would commemorate Albert Borella's service with "The Borella Ride", a re-enactment of aspects of his ride from the Tennant Creek area of the Northern Territory to Darwin. The ride will be made in February–March 2015. A television advertisement raising awareness of Borella and the forthcoming re-enactment began on 4 August.

On 3 February 2015, Borella's Victoria Cross was escorted to the Parliament House of the Northern Territory in an armed convoy. The VC and its accompanying medal group, and a Luger pistol brought home by Borella from the Western Front, remained on public display in the Parliament House for two months. The Borella family, including Rowan Borella – the surviving son of Borella – accompanied the Borella Ride from its departure on 20 February until its arrival on 3 March in Darwin.

== Documentary ==
On 10–11 November 2016, the documentary Albert Borella VC – an Incredible Journey, aired on Channel 9 in the Northern Territory and nationally on 9Now. The film was made by Military Myths Defeated, a Territory-based company.

== Medals ==

Ribbon	Description	Notes
	Victoria Cross (VC)	1918
	Military Medal (MM)	1917
	1914–15 Star	
	British War Medal	
	Victory Medal	With MID Oakleaf
	War Medal 1939–1945	
	Australia Service Medal 1939–1945	
	King George VI Coronation Medal	1937
	Queen Elizabeth II Coronation Medal	1953
