= Alfred Square, St Kilda =

Park in Melbourne, Australia

Alfred Square, St. Kilda, Melbourne
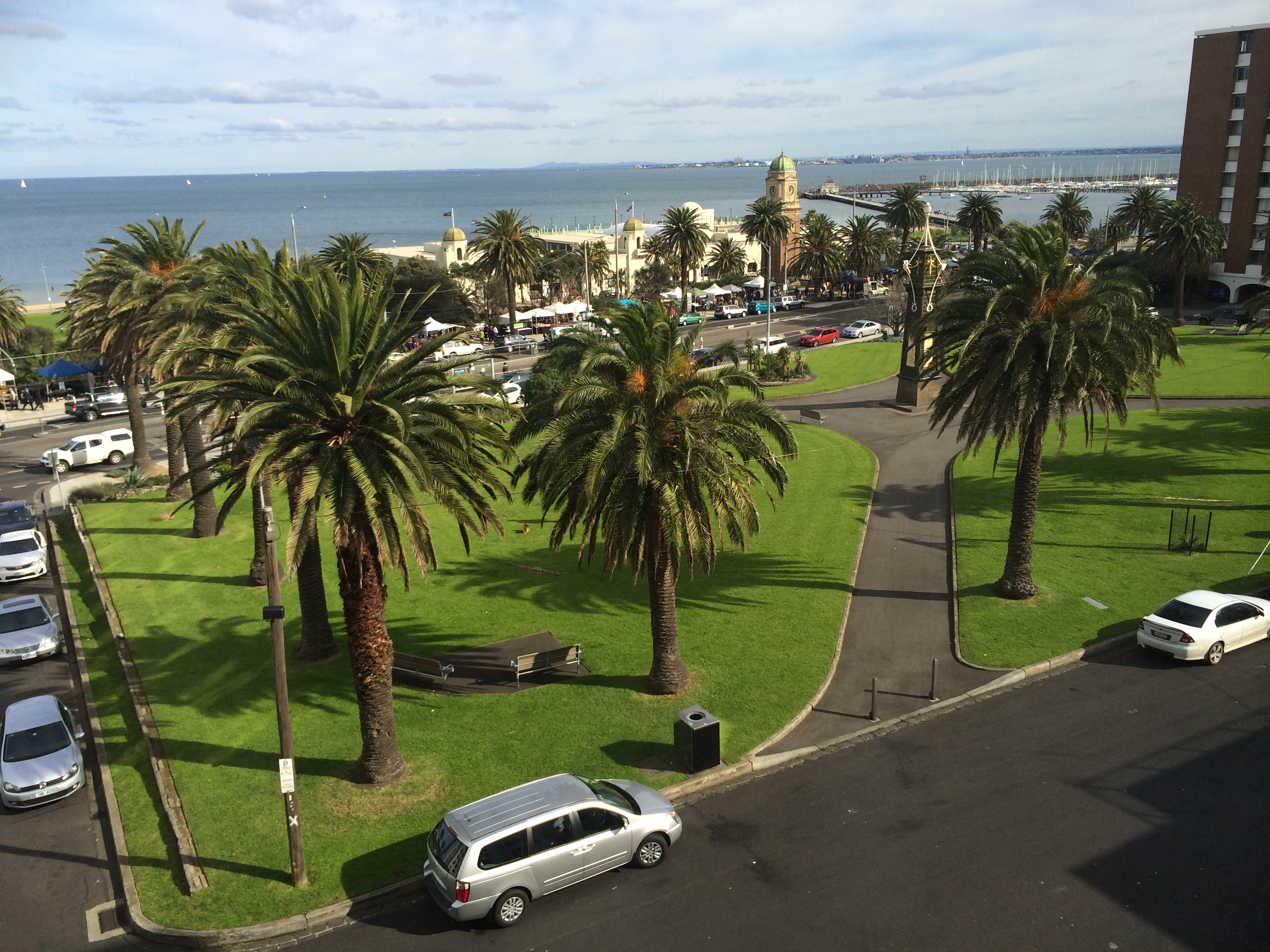
- 2014 view from the Novotel Hotel
- Interactive map of Alfred Square, St. Kilda, Melbourne
- Coordinates: 37.864967°S 144.973937°E

Alfred Square is a park in St. Kilda, Melbourne abutting The Esplanade, it is bounded by low stone walls on the south and west, and crossed by paths. It contains memorials to the South Africa (2nd Boer) War and Victoria Cross recipients as well as a commemorative plaque for the first recorded building in St. Kilda.

== History ==
In the early 1800s, the area was known as Custom House Reserve or "Custom Reserve".

In 1861, a bowling green was in use within the reserve, and a tall flagstaff where the council flew the British flag on "every high day, and holiday".

The forthcoming visit to Australia in 1868 of Prince Alfred, second son and fourth child of Queen Victoria of the United Kingdom and Prince Albert of Saxe-Coburg and Gotha motivated the renaming of many sites including this square park in his honour. In 1867, St. Kilda Council accepted the offer from two local residents to erect "a flagstaff 100 feet high with gaff stays etc." in the Custom House Reserve, to be called the Prince Alfred Flagstaff. Council also agreed to their request to rename the area as the "Alfred Reserve".

The Prince's first set foot on Victorian soil at St. Kilda and the flagpole was dressed with St. George's Cross at the main, and ensign at gaff.

In July 1868, the Victorian Lands and Survey authorities proclaimed a Crown Grant of "1 acre, 3 roods, 18 perches" "reserved for public purposes". The park was thereafter called Prince Albert Square and often shortened to "Alfred Square".

In 1873, the Planting Committee of the St. Kilda Council recommended "that Alfred Square, occupying as it does such a commanding position on the Esplanade, be enclosed by a dwarf wall, surrounded by handsome iron palings, furnished with suitable gates, and that it be levelled, laid out, and planted." The estimated cost of £1,000 was too much for the council, and the work was not done.

== South Africa (2nd Boer) War Memorial ==
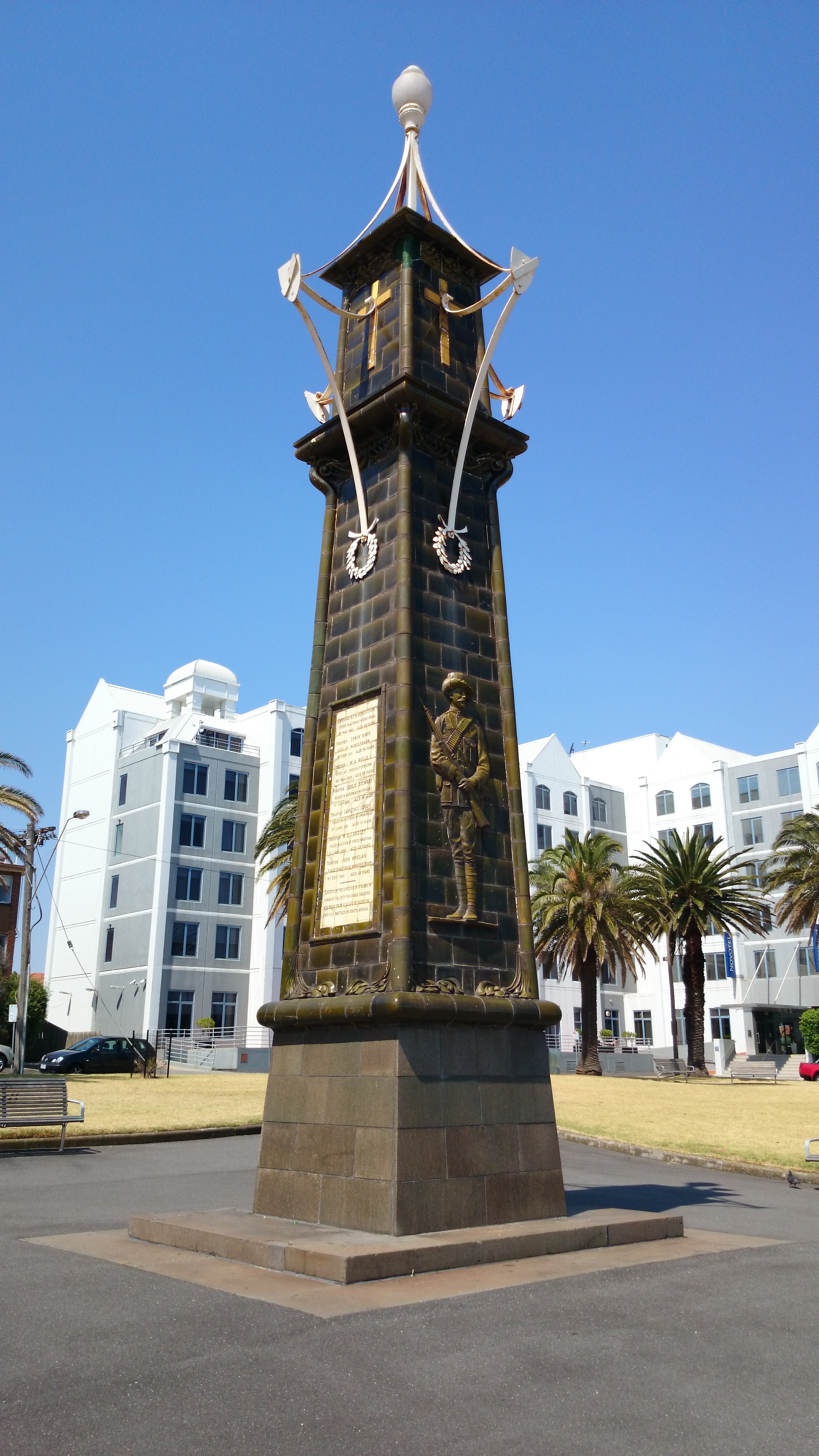
South African Memorial

In 1900, residents of St. Kilda held a "God's Speed" gathering in the St. Kilda Town Hall for the 77 young soldiers of St. Kilda who had enlisted in the Victorian Bushmen's Corps for service in the Second Boer War fought in South Africa from 1899 to 1902.

In 1905, St. Kilda Mayor called for a city memorial and £250 was raised through fetes, subscriptions, and entertainments. The memorial was designed by Arthur Peck for no fee and Mitcham Tesselated Tile Co. won the tender to construct.

The memorial is built in brick covered by faience work. The supporting angles are formed to represent the trunks of gum-trees, branching out into leaves and cones under the main cornice, and the roots are shown on a bold projection above the base. Above the main cornice is a cross of a deep golden colour, which stands out clearly from the green tone of the general mass of work. One panel shows the names of the seven soldiers from St. Kilda who died. Two other panels record the names of the 58 who fought the Empire's battles and returned. On the fourth panel is the figure of a soldier, dressed in Australian khaki, and facing the sea. Above the main column is a wrought-iron pillar, supported by brackets, enriched with shields; and under the golden cross rests a finely executed wreath on each panel.

The memorial was unveiled on 12 March 1905, by the Victorian Governor, Major-General Hon. Sir Reginald Arthur James Talbot, K.C.B. The Sixth Australian Regiment provided a guard of honor of 280 men and the St. Kilda Boys' Naval Brigade played "The Death of Nelson," and the united choirs of All Saints, Holy Trinity and Christ Churches sang the "Old Hundredth," and "God Save the King." After the Governor's speech, he unloosened the Union Jack furled around the Memorial, and the eight buglers of the A.I.R. blew the "Last Post," the soldiers' "Good Night! Good Night!".

== Victoria Cross Monument ==
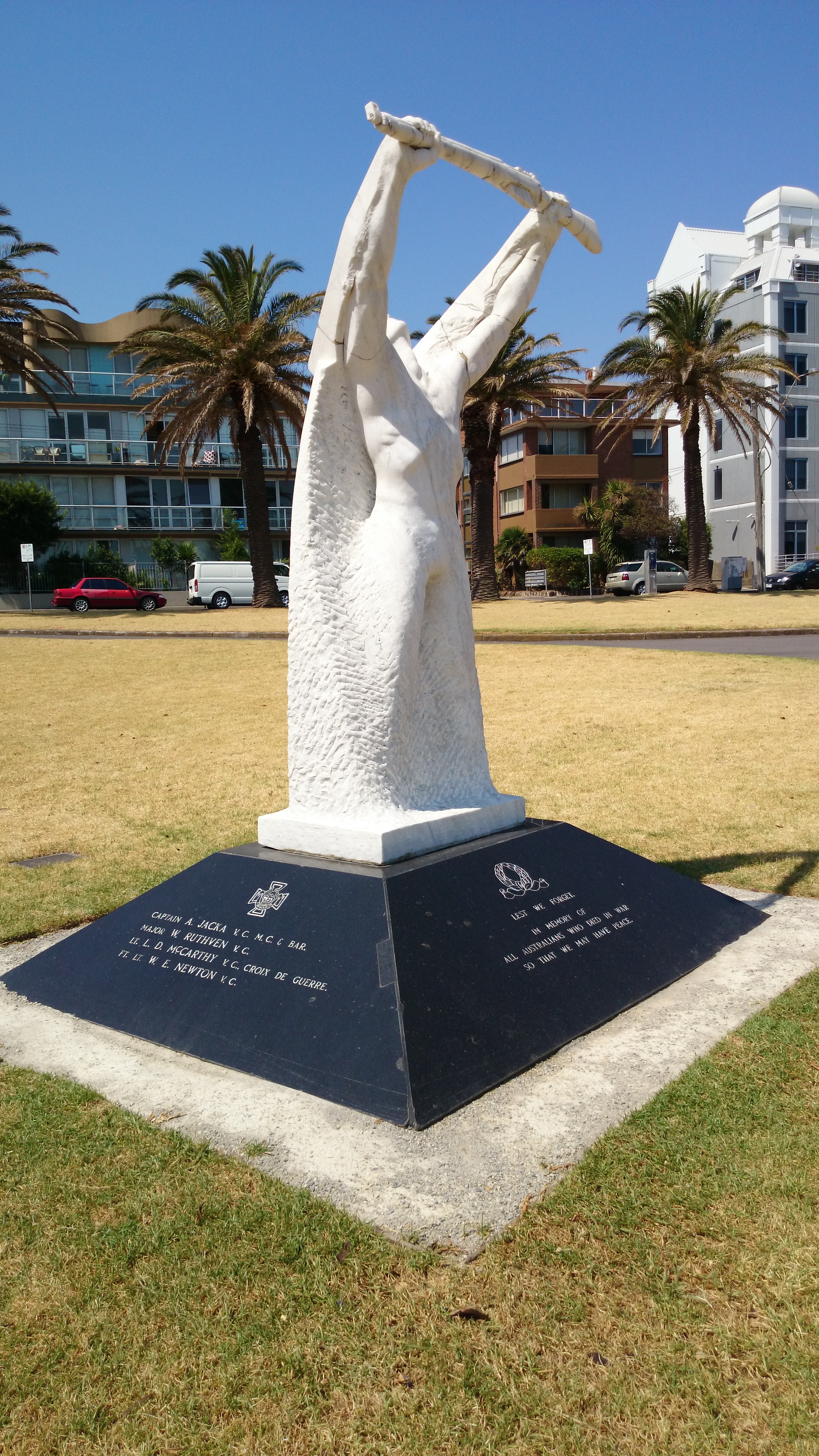
Victoria Cross Monument

In 1985, a monument named as the Victoria Cross Monument was erected and dedicated "In memory of all Australians who died in war so that we may have peace". The monument depicts a white sculpted figure of a soldier bearing a rifle above his head and was designed by Peter Schipperheyn. It lists Victoria Cross recipients from St Kilda including Albert Jacka on the right side and the titles of conflicts with numbers of St Kilda dead on the left side.

== Site or First Building in St. Kilda ==
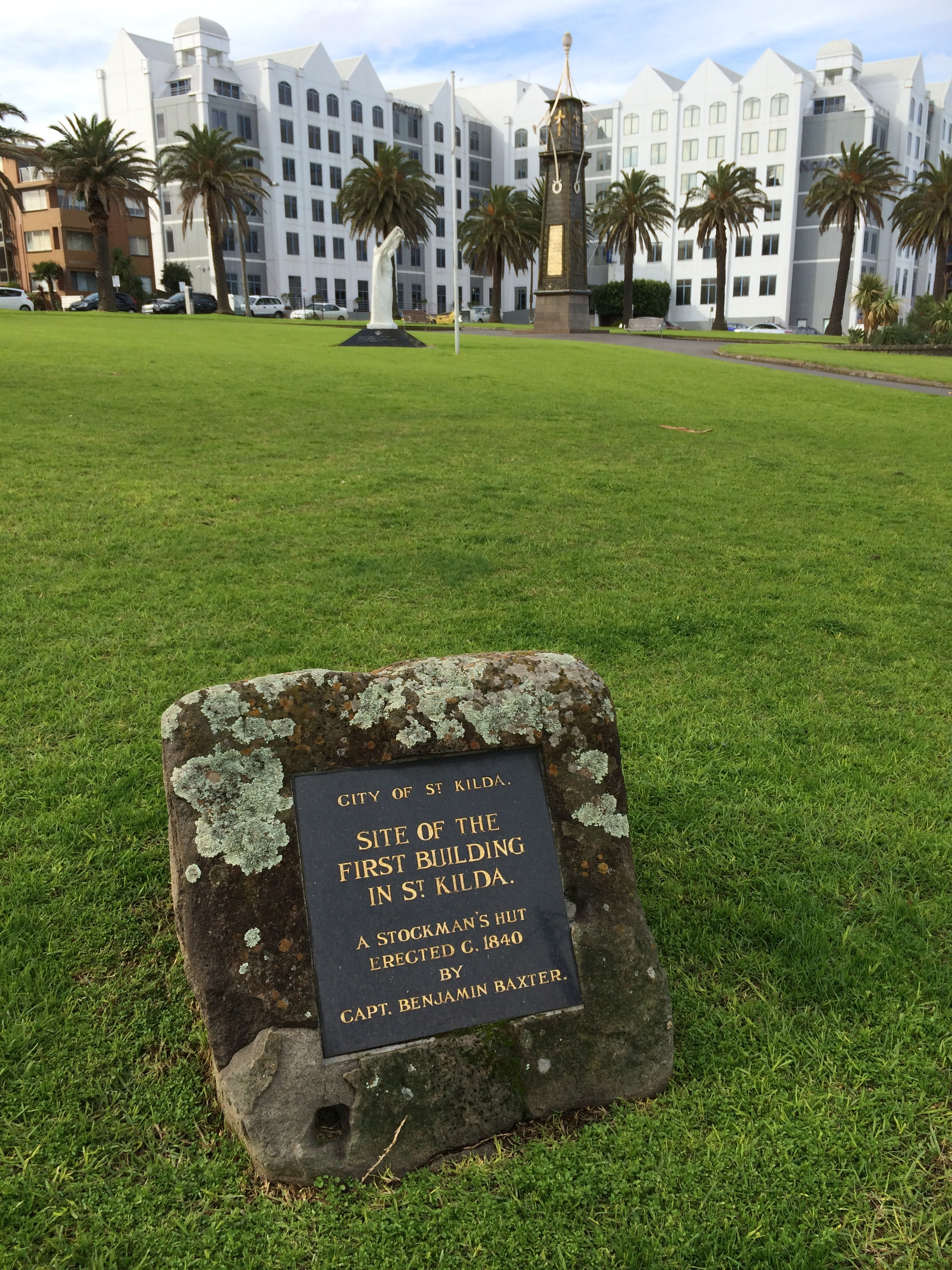
Site of First Building

To the north of the square is a plaque embedded into volcanic rock erected by the City of St Kilda to commemorate the site of the first recorded building in St Kilda which it states to be a "stockman's hut erected circa 1840 by Captain Benjamin Baxter". In 1842, the first Government plan of the village of St. Kilda showed a hut at the south west corner of the reserve. This hut, the first recorded dwelling in St. Kilda, was likely to have been occupied by a stockman employed by George Thomas and John Enscoe, of the shipping agents, Thomas, Enscoe & James, who had a business at the corner of Flinders and Williams Street, Melbourne. The hut is likely to have been first built during Baxter's lease.

== Gallery ==
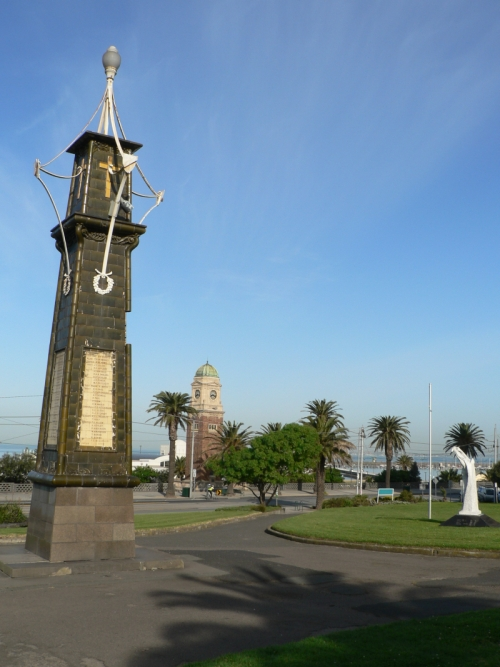
Alfred Square with South African War Memorial in foreground

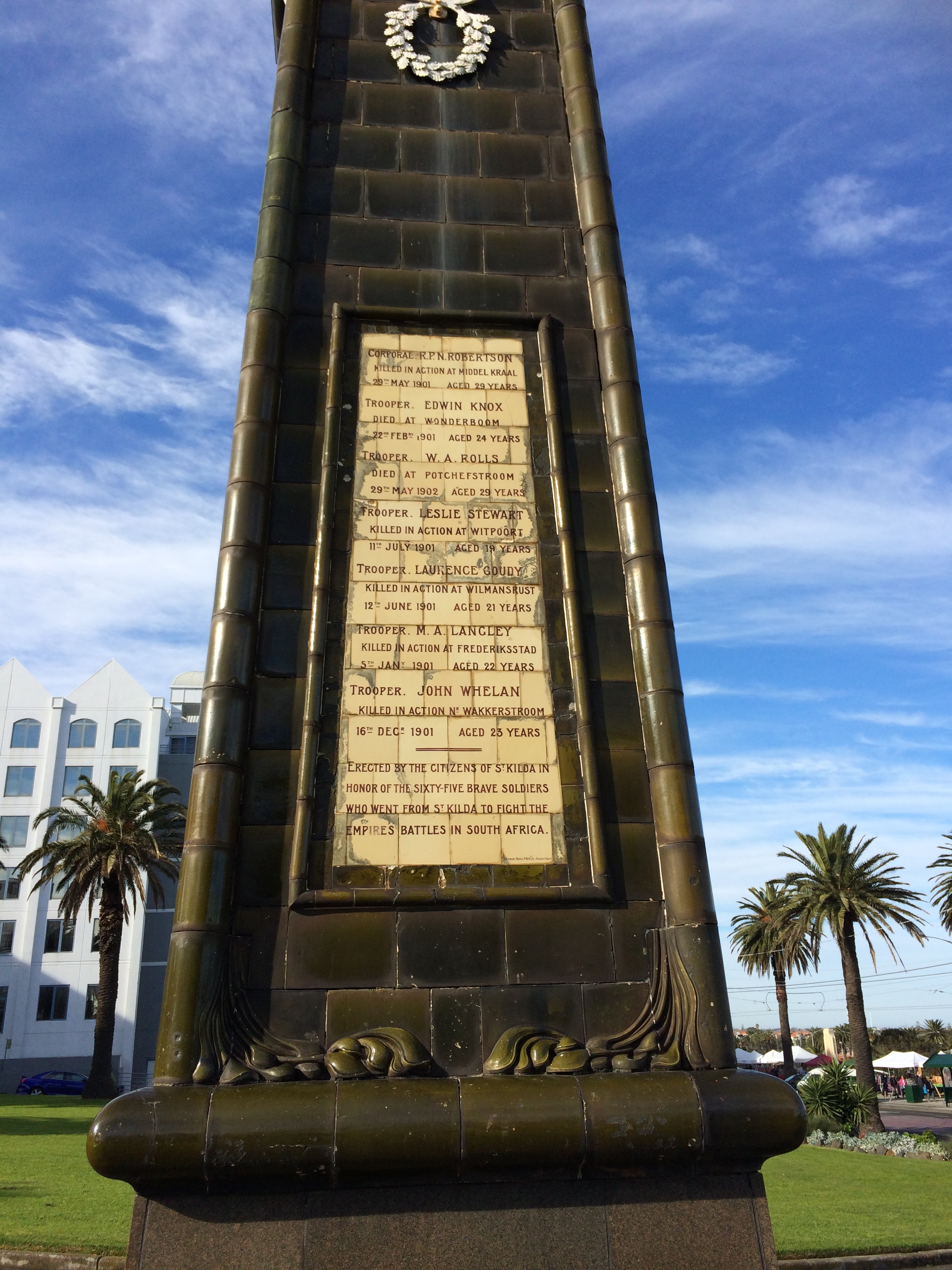
South African War Memorial Memorial Albert Square North Side

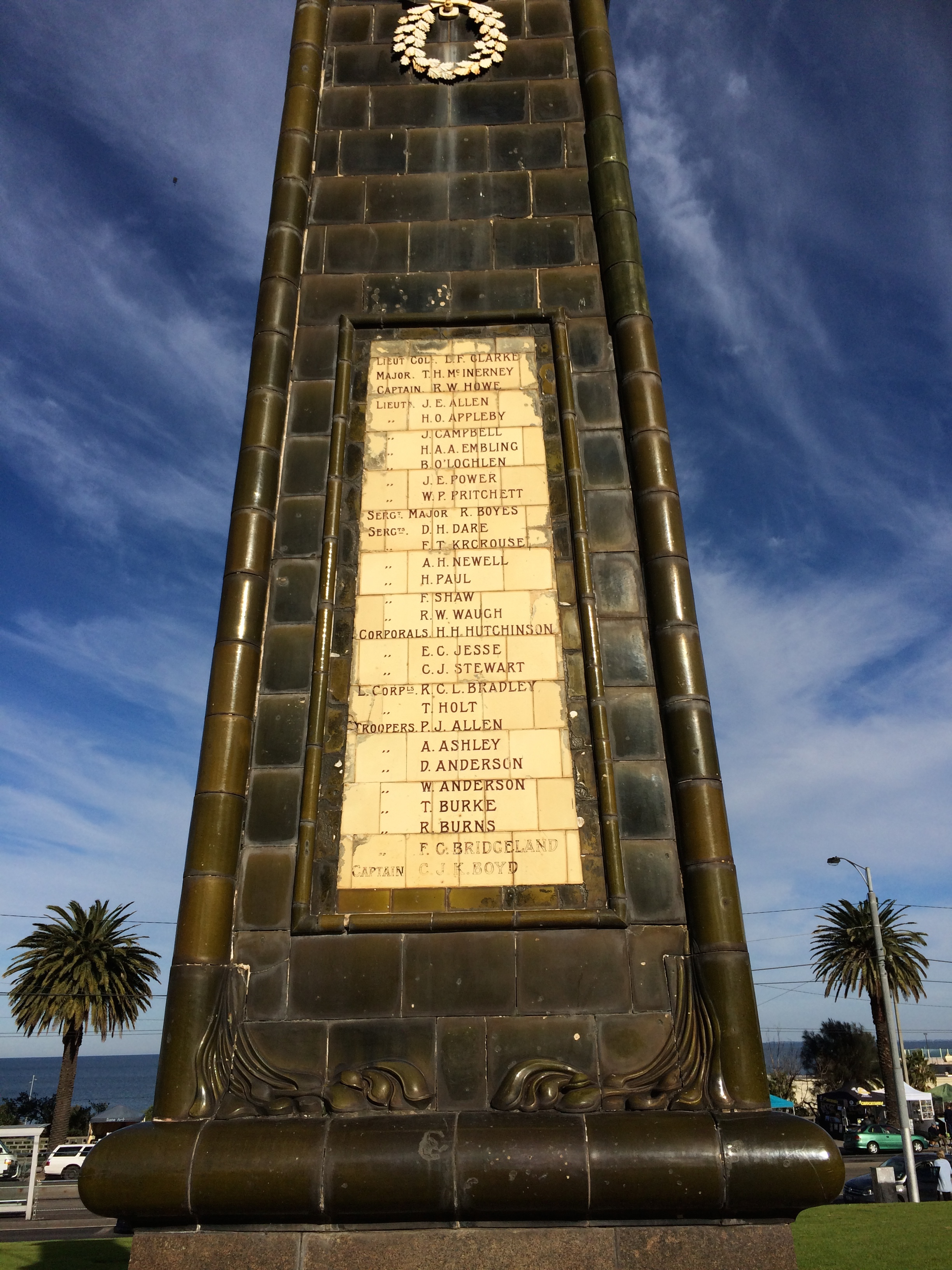
South African War Memorial Memorial Albert Square East Side

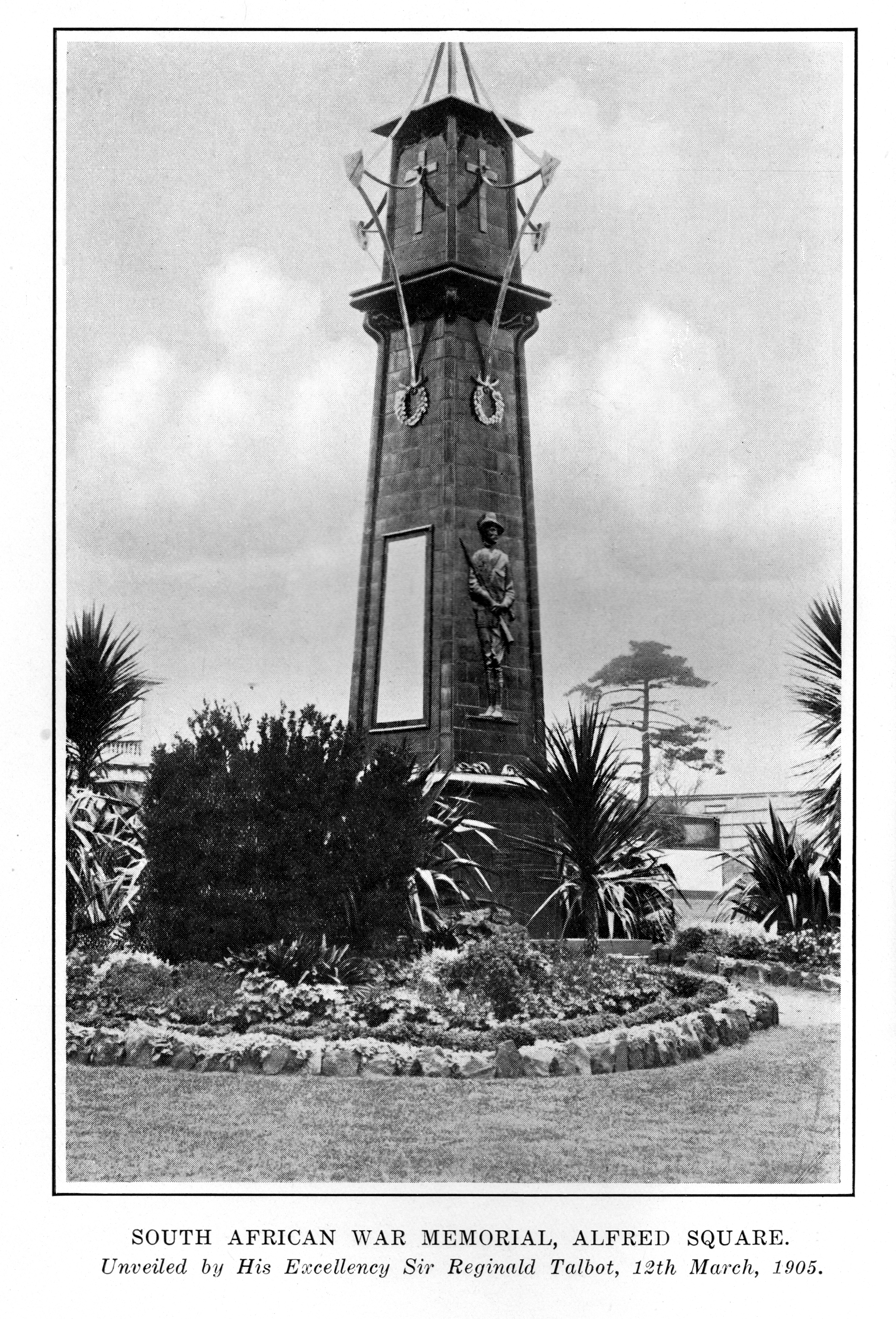
South African War Memorial Alfred Square 1931

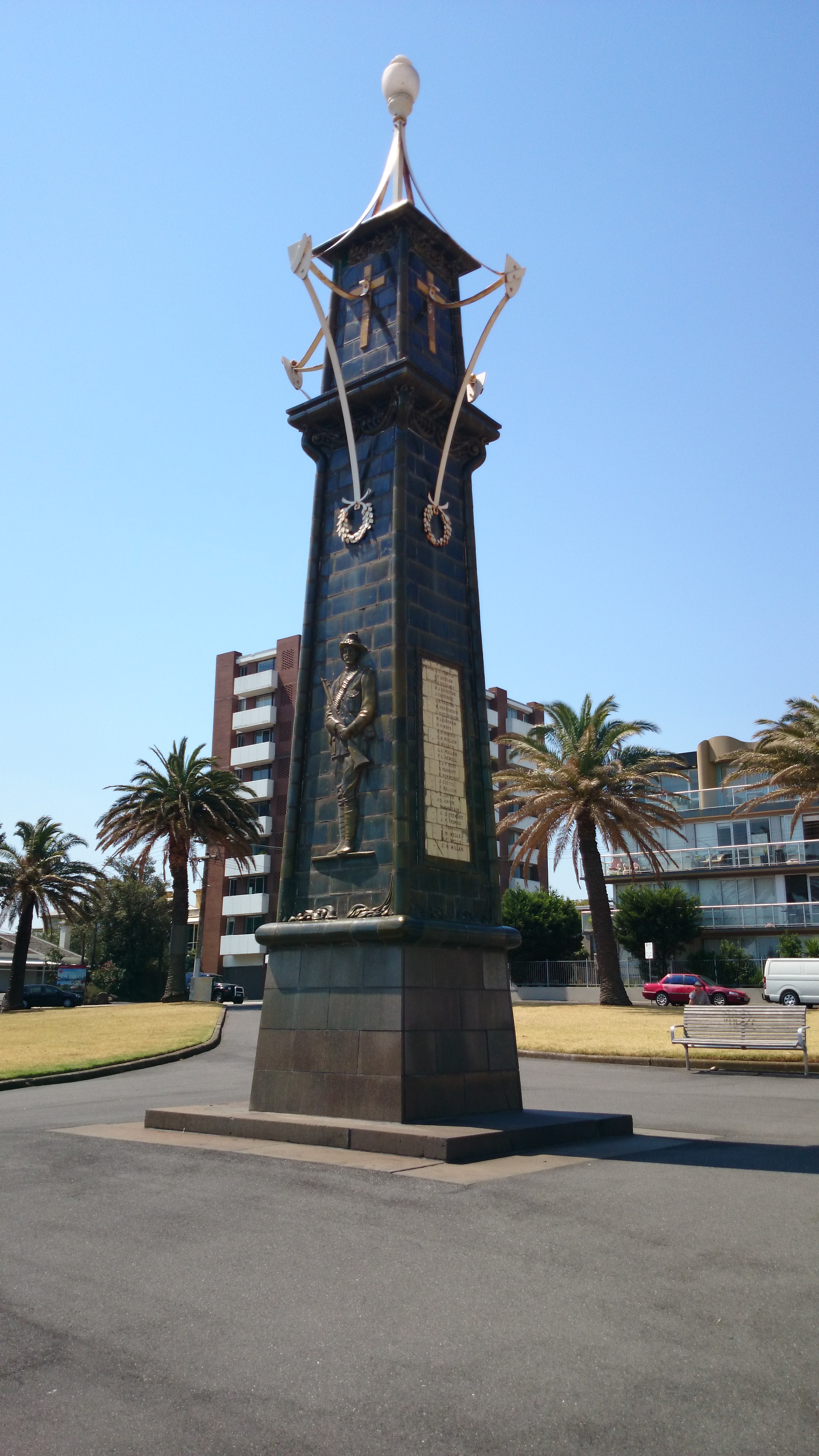
South African War Memorial Alfred Square from south west

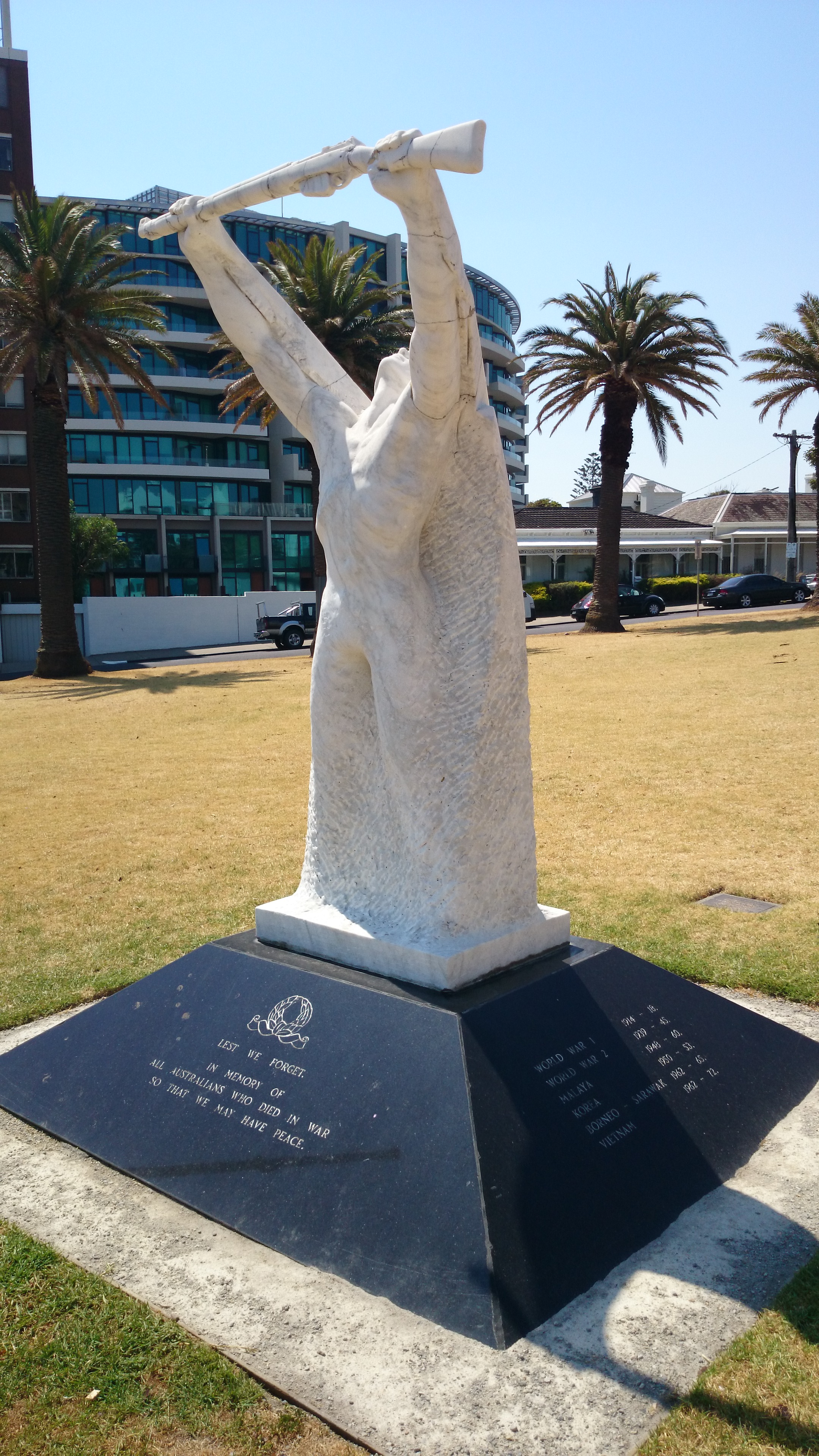
Victoria Cross Monument from north west
