= Albert Jacka =

Australian Victoria Cross recipient and Mayor of St. Kilda

Albert Jacka VC, MC & Bar
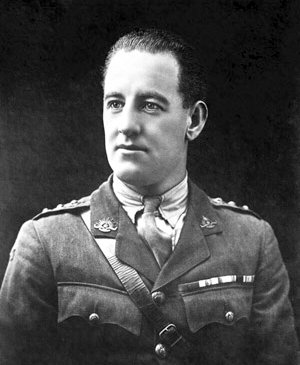
- Captain Albert Jacka c. 1920
- Born: 10 January 1893; Winchelsea, Victoria
- Died: 17 January 1932 (aged 39); St. Kilda, Victoria
- Military career
- Allegiance: Australia
- Branch: Australian Imperial Force
- Service years: 1914–1920
- Rank: Captain
- Nickname: Bert
- Unit: 14th Battalion
- Conflicts: First World War; Gallipoli Campaign; Battle of Chunuk Bair; Third attack on Anzac Cove; Western Front; Battle of the Somme; Battle of Pozières (WIA); Battle of Messines; Ploegsteert Wood sector (WIA); Battle of Passchendaele; Battle of Polygon Wood; German spring offensive; Second Battle of Villers-Bretonneux (WIA)
- Awards: Victoria Cross; Military Cross & Bar
- Other work: Mayor of the City of St Kilda (1930–1931)

Albert Jacka, VC, MC & Bar (10 January 1893 – 17 January 1932) was an Australian recipient of the Victoria Cross, the highest decoration for gallantry "in the face of the enemy" that can be awarded to members of the British and Commonwealth armed forces. Jacka was the first Australian to be decorated with the VC during the First World War, receiving the medal for his actions during the Gallipoli Campaign. He later served on the Western Front and was twice more decorated for his bravery.

After the war, Jacka returned to Australia and entered business, establishing the electrical goods importing and exporting business Roxburgh, Jacka & Co. Pty Ltd. He was later elected to the local council, becoming mayor of the City of St Kilda. Jacka never fully recovered from the wounds he sustained during his war service, and died aged 39.

== Early life ==
Albert Jacka was born on a dairy farm near Winchelsea, Victoria, on 10 January 1893, the fourth of seven children to Nathaniel Jacka and his English-born wife Elizabeth (née Kettle). His family moved to Wedderburn, Victoria, when he was five years old, where he attended the local school before working with his father as a haulage contractor. He was working for the Victorian State Forests Department at Heathcote when the First World War broke out. His career over three years took him along the southern side of the Murray River to Wedderburn, Cohuna, Koondrook, Lake Charm and Heathcote. His work included fencing, fire break clearing and tree planting. Jacka is one of twenty employees shown on the Forests Department Roll of Honour.

== First World War ==
=== Enlistment and training ===
Jacka enlisted in the Australian Imperial Force on 18 September 1914, with the rank of private. He was assigned to the 14th Battalion, 4th Brigade, 1st Division and finished his training at Broadmeadows Camp.

After Turkey became a German ally, the 1st Division was sent to Egypt to defend the Suez Canal. Jacka and his battalion arrived at Alexandria on 31 January 1915. During ten weeks of training south of Cairo the 4th Brigade was merged with two New Zealand brigades and merged with the 1st Light Horse Brigade to form the New Zealand and Australian Division (NZ&A) under Major General Alexander Godley.

=== Gallipoli ===
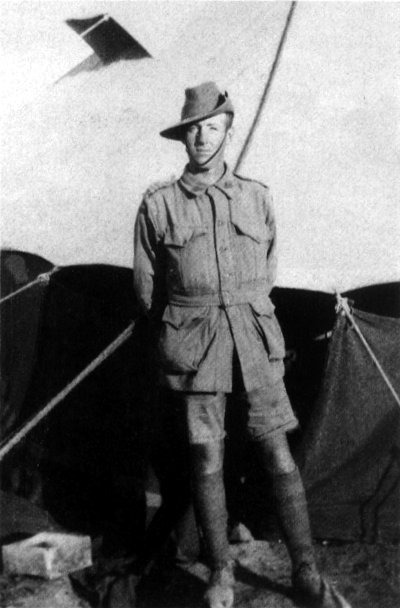
Corporal Albert Jacka on Mudros, 1915

Jacka fought in the Gallipoli campaign that started on 25 April 1915, when his new division landed at Anzac Cove on the 26th in the Dardanelles, fighting against Turkish defenders on a narrow beach and in the steep ravines and hills above. The position was held by New Zealanders and Australians by digging a series of trenches. The trenches held by the 14th Battalion on 19 May 1915 became known as Courtney's Post, which was where Jacka was awarded the Victoria Cross.

On 19 May 1915, the Turks launched an assault against the Anzac Line, capturing a section of the trench at Courtney's Post; one end of which was guarded by Jacka. For several minutes he fired warning shots into the trench wall until reinforcements arrived, after which he attempted to enter the trench with three others; all but Jacka were either wounded or pinned. It was then decided that while a feint attack was made from the same end, Jacka would attack from the rear. The party then proceeded to engage the Turks with rifle fire, throwing in two bombs as Jacka skirted around to attack from the flank. He climbed out onto "no man's land", entering the trench via the parapet. In the resulting conflict, Jacka shot five Turkish soldiers and bayoneted two others, forcing the remainder to flee the trench; he then held the trench alone for the remainder of the night. Jacka's platoon commander, Lieutenant Crabbe, informed him the following morning that he would be recommended for his bravery.

The full citation for the Victoria Cross appeared in a supplement to The London Gazette on 23 July 1915:

War Office, 24th July, 1915

His Majesty the King has been graciously pleased to award the Victoria Cross to the undermentioned Officers and Non-commissioned Officers:-

No. 465 Lance-Corporal Albert Jacka, 14th Battalion, Australian Imperial Forces.

For most conspicuous bravery on the night of the 19th–20th May, 1915 at "Courtney's Post", Gallipoli Peninsula.

Lance-Corporal Jacka, while holding a portion of our trench with four other men, was heavily attacked. When all except himself were killed or wounded, the trench was rushed and occupied by seven Turks. Lance-Corporal Jacka at once most gallantly attacked them single-handed, and killed the whole party, five by rifle fire and two with the bayonet.

Following his VC action, Jacka instantly became a national hero; he received the £500 and gold watch that the prominent Melbourne business and sporting identity, John Wren, had promised to the first Australian of the war to receive the VC, his image was used on recruiting posters and magazine covers, and he received rapid promotions; first to corporal on 28 August, to sergeant two weeks later on 12 September, and then to company sergeant major on 14 November. He became company sergeant major of C Company, and saw much fighting at Gallipoli where, during August at Chunuk Bair, Hill 971, and Hill 60, his battalion took part in an Allied offensive aimed at trying to break the deadlock around the beachhead. After nine months of fighting and 26,111 Australian casualties, the Allied forces began to evacuate the peninsula in December 1915, after which Jacka's battalion was withdrawn to Egypt.

In Egypt, he passed through officer training school with high marks, and on 29 April 1916 was commissioned as a second lieutenant. During this time, the AIF expanded and was reorganised; the 14th Battalion was split and provided experienced soldiers for the 46th Battalion, and the 4th Brigade was combined with the 12th and 13th Brigades to form the 4th Australian Division.

=== Western Front ===
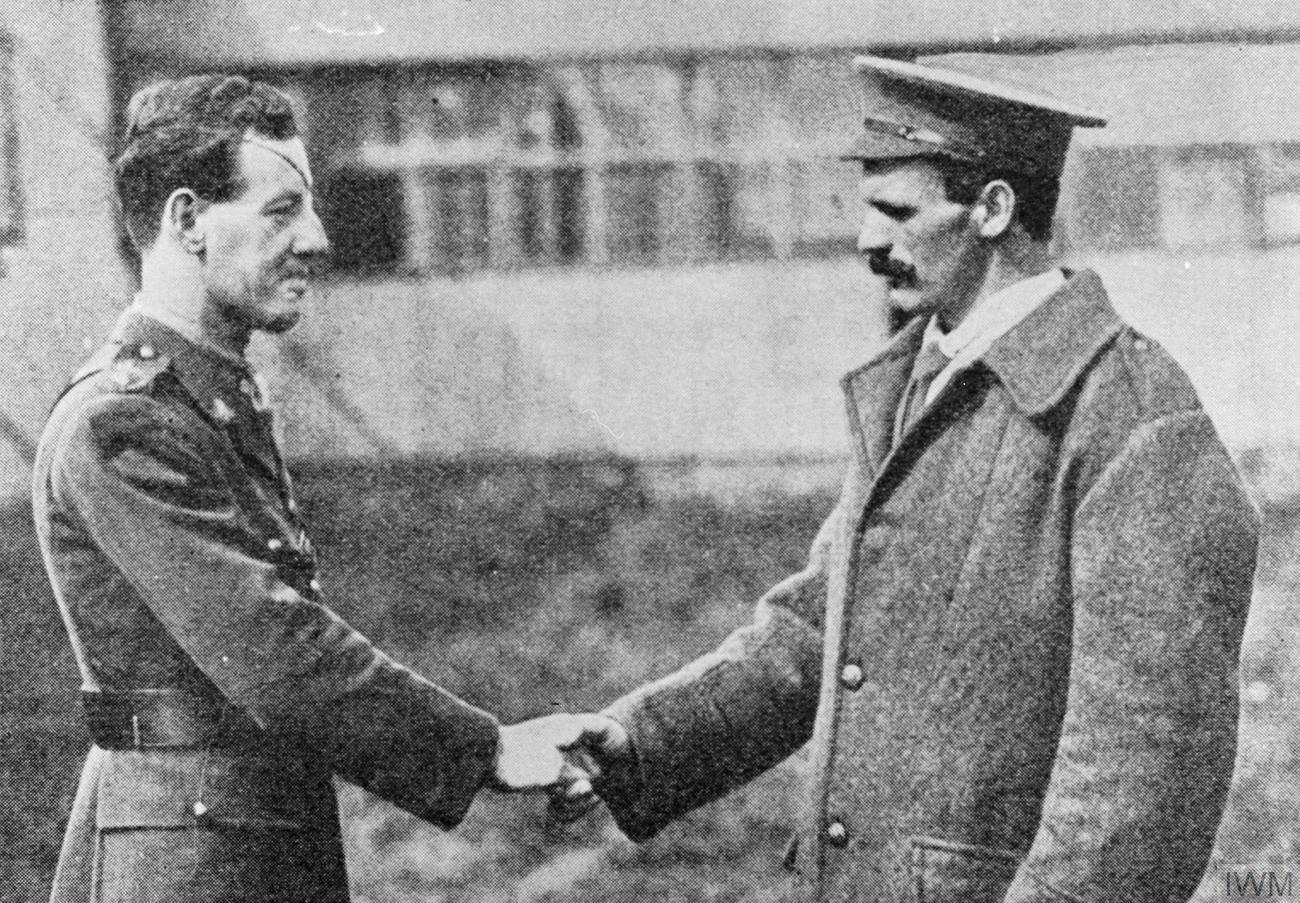
Jacka with fellow VC recipient Martin O'Meara, 1916. Both were in England recuperating from wounds.

The division was sent to France, and the Western Front, in June 1916, where Jacka and his unit were assigned to the Allied trenches near Armentières, participating in several raids against the German trenches. Following the heavy casualties on the Somme, the 14th Battalion was transferred to the Pozières sector of the Somme offensive. Jacka's division, on 23 July 1916, was involved in the attack of Pozières planned by Major General Harold Bridgwood Walker. The Australian division suffered 5,285 casualties after three days of fighting. The Australian force captured Pozières, but the fight was so bloody that the Australians could only identify their trenches by the bodies of their comrades showing their red-and-white shoulder patches.

On the morning of 7 August 1916, after a night of heavy shelling, the Germans began to overrun a portion of the line which included Jacka's dug-out. Jacka had just completed a reconnaissance, and had gone to his dug-out when two Germans appeared at its entrance and rolled a bomb down the doorway, killing two of his men. Emerging from the dug-out, Jacka came upon a large number of Germans rounding up some forty Australians as prisoners. Only seven men from his platoon had recovered from the blast; rallying these few, he charged at the enemy. Heavy hand-to-hand fighting ensued, as the Australian prisoners turned on their captors. Every member of the platoon was wounded, including Jacka who was wounded seven times; including an injury from a bullet that passed through his body under his right shoulder, and two head wounds. Fifty Germans were captured and the line was retaken; Jacka was personally credited with killing between twelve and twenty Germans during the engagement.

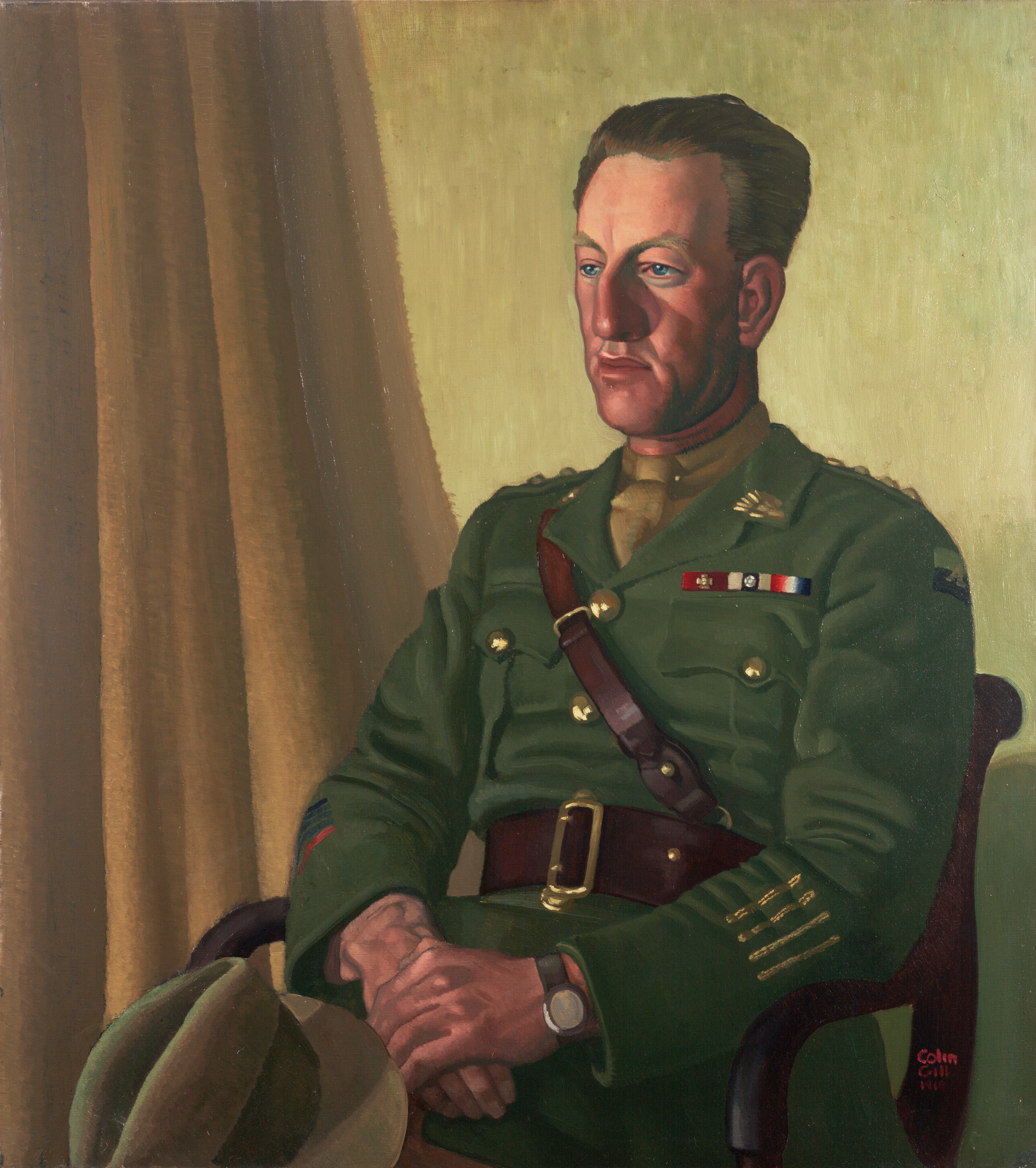
Captain A Jacka, VC, MC and Bar (1919) by Colin Gill (Art. IWM ART 1915)

Jacka was awarded the Military Cross (MC) for his actions at Pozières, although he was originally recommended for the Distinguished Service Order. The citation for his MC reads as follows:

For conspicuous gallantry. He led his platoon against a large number of the enemy, who had counter-attacked the battalion on his right. The enemy were driven back, some prisoners they had taken were recovered, and 50 of the enemy captured. He was himself wounded in this attack.

Many present at the time, as well as many historians since, have voiced the opinion that Jacka deserved a second VC for the Pozières action. One of only two bars (second award) to the VC awarded during the war was earned the following day by Captain Noel Godfrey Chavasse of the Royal Army Medical Corps. Chavasse subsequently died of wounds sustained during this second VC action. The other bar to the VC was earned by Arthur Martin-Leake during the period 29 October to 8 November 1914 near Zonnebeke, Belgium, when, according to his award citation, Martin-Leake showed most conspicuous bravery and devotion to duty in rescuing, while exposed to constant fire, a large number of the wounded who were lying close to the enemy's trenches. Martin-Leake was the first of only three men to be awarded a bar to his VC.

Although traditionally the reason Jacka was not awarded a bar to his VC has been ascribed to British snobbery towards a "rough colonial", this view has been challenged. Gordon Corrigan, in Blood Mud and Poppycock, points out that it was Jacka's Australian superiors who chose not to recommend him for the award, and he argues that this may have been due to the fact that the Germans easily infiltrated Jacka's platoon position in broad daylight without being challenged. The sentries were most likely asleep or absent and Jacka should have ensured that they were not; as such it may have been perceived that while Jacka should be commended for his robust action in responding to the situation, he also bore a responsibility for allowing it to happen in the first place.

After the incident, Jacka was evacuated to England, where he was promoted to lieutenant on 18 August 1916, but was falsely reported dead on 8 September. He attended an investiture ceremony at Windsor Castle on 29 September; receiving his Victoria Cross from King George V, before rejoining his unit in November. Promoted to captain on 15 March 1917, he was appointed the 14th Battalion's intelligence officer.

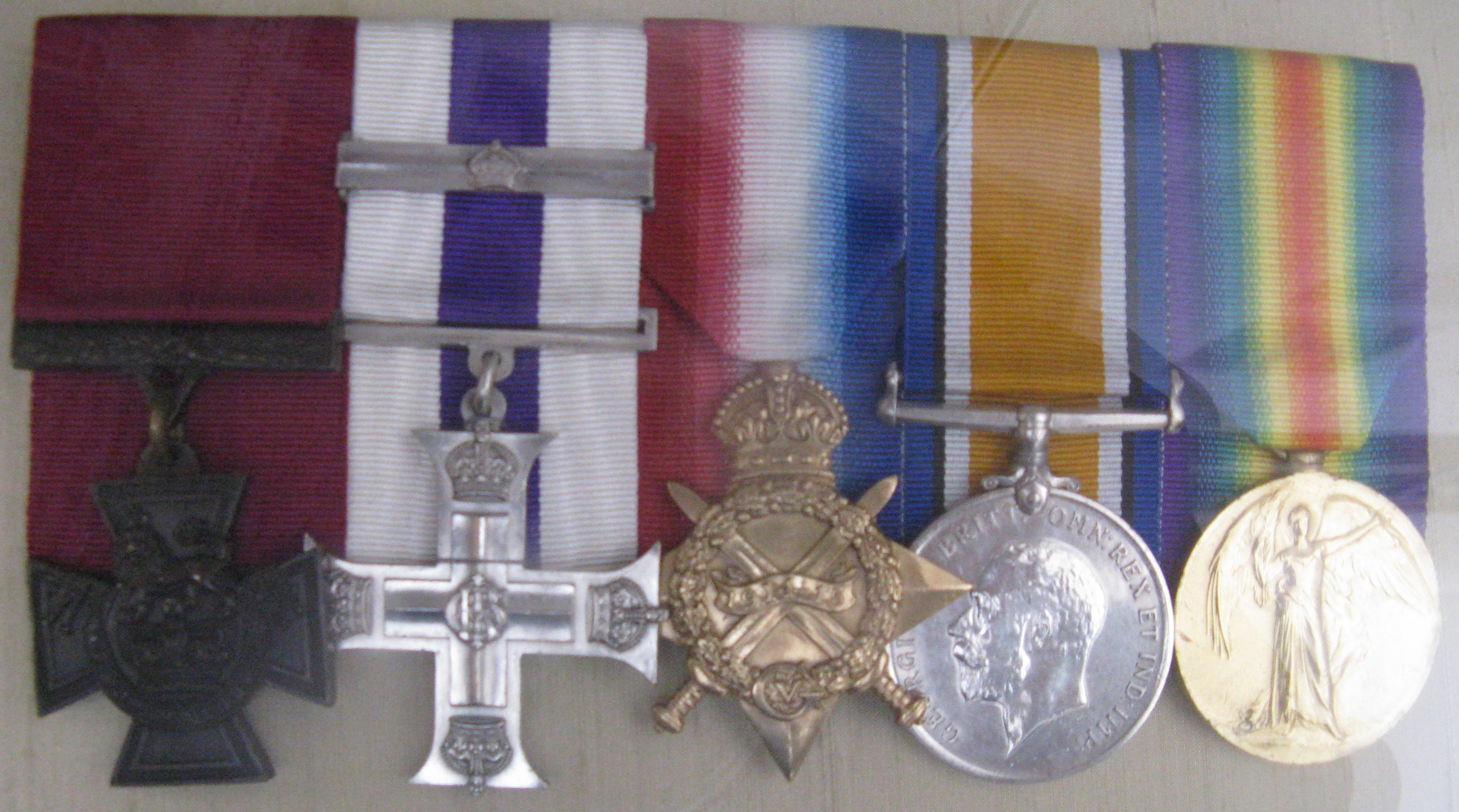
Albert Jacka's medals on display while on loan to the State Library of South Australia, 8 August 2010.

By early 1917, the Germans had retired to the Hindenburg Line, and on 8 April Jacka led a night reconnaissance party into "no man's land", near Bullecourt to inspect enemy defences before an Allied attack against the new German line. He penetrated the wire at two places, reported back, then went out again to supervise the laying of tapes to guide the assault parties; in the process he single-handedly captured a two-man German patrol. He was awarded a Bar to his MC for this action. The bar's citation reads as follows:

For conspicuous gallantry and devotion to duty. He carried out a daring reconnaissance of the enemy's position and obtained most valuable information. Later, he rendered invaluable assistance in guiding troops to their assembly positions.

Later, Jacka was given command of D Company, 14th Battalion, and in June led his men through the Battle for Messines Ridge. During their advance, the company overran several machine gun posts and captured a German field gun; Jacka's actions went unrecognised. On 8 July, he was wounded by a sniper near Ploegsteert Wood, resulting in nearly two months hospitalisation. Returning to the front, he led the 14th Battalion on 26 September in an attack against German pill-boxes during the Battle of Polygon Wood. Jacka was recommended for the Distinguished Service Order a second time for this feat, but again it was not granted. In May 1918, Jacka was finally removed from the conflict when, outside the village of Villers-Bretonneux, he was badly gassed and a missile passed through his trachea. He was evacuated to No. 20 Casualty Clearing Station at Vignacourt, where it was thought that he would not recover. When he did, he was sent to Britain for two operations and a long recuperative period.

He returned to Australia on 6 September 1919 and his AIF appointment ended on 10 January 1920, when he returned to Melbourne to a hero's welcome.

== Later life ==
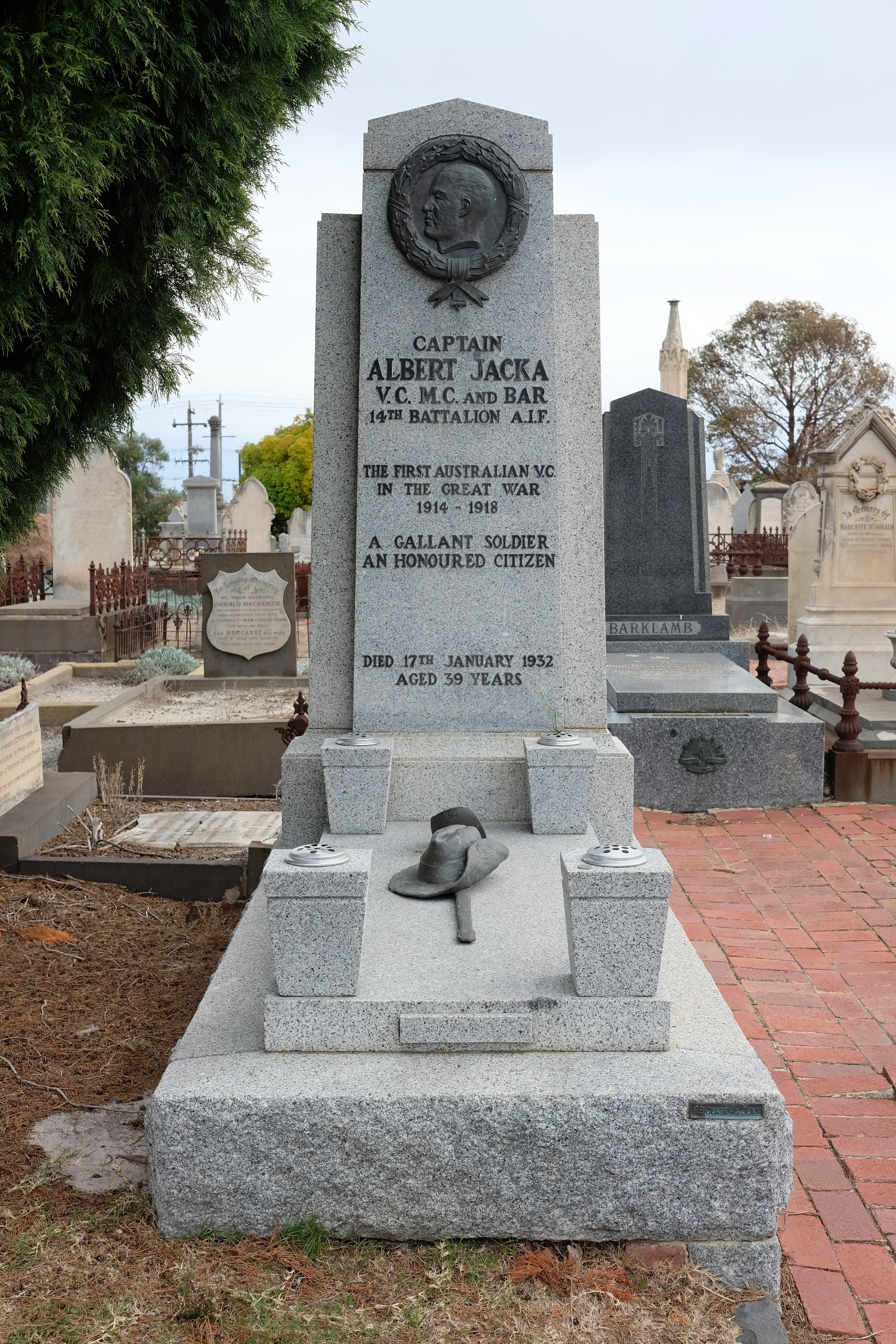
The grave of Albert Jacka in St Kilda cemetery.

After the war, Jacka had a job waiting for him with the Forests Department, but together with R. O. Roxburgh and E. J. L. Edmonds, both former members of the 14th Battalion, he established the electrical goods importing and exporting business Roxburgh, Jacka & Co. Pty Ltd. The business was heavily financed by John Wren, but collapsed with the Great Depression in 1931.

On 17 January 1921, at St Mary's Catholic Church, St Kilda, Jacka married Frances Veronica Carey, a typist from his office. The pair settled in St. Kilda, and later adopted a daughter, Betty. In September, 1929, he was elected to the Council of the City of St Kilda, becoming mayor the following year. Much of his civic work was characterised by his strong interest in assisting the unemployed, defending evictees and proposing public works for the 'sussos': 'sustenance workers', employed on public works by the Government as a relief measure.

On 14 December 1931, Jacka collapsed after a council meeting and was admitted to Caulfield Military Hospital. On 17 January 1932, one week after his 39th birthday, he died from chronic nephritis; he was buried at St Kilda Cemetery, with eight other Victoria Cross recipients acting as pallbearers and an estimated 6,000 witnesses to the burial as his body passed en route to the cemetery.

Albert Jacka's Victoria Cross is displayed at the Australian War Memorial in Canberra, and a commemorative service is held on the Sunday closest to the anniversary of his death, 17 January, in St. Kilda to honour Jacka; originally organised by former members of the 14th Battalion, it is now held by Port Phillip City Council. The regimental colour of the 14th Battalion is laid up in St Kilda Town Hall.

== Memorials ==
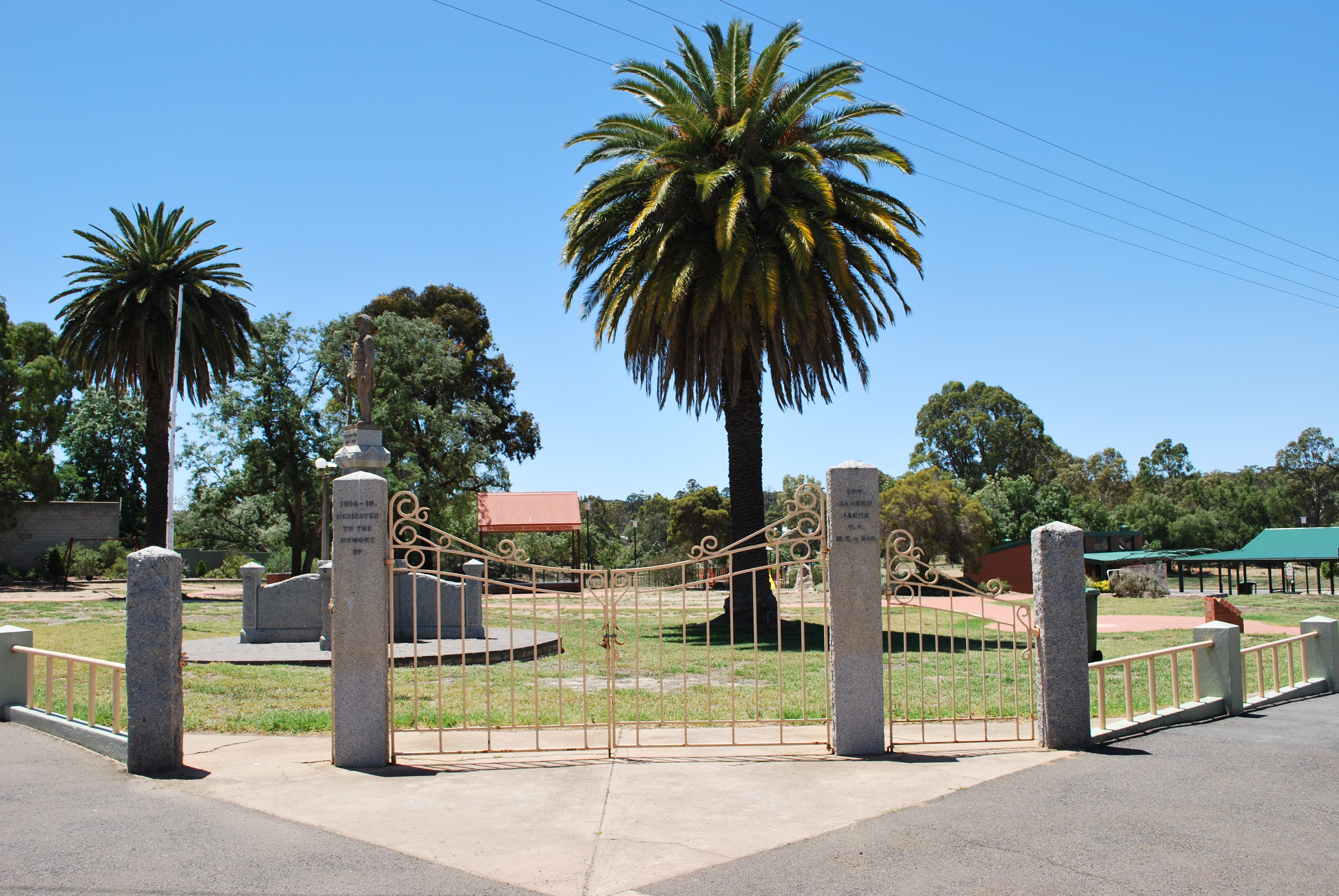
Wedderburn Albert Jacka Gates

- Albert Jacka Grave, St Kilda (37.861094°S 145.002349°E). Every year in January, a memorial service at the grave is organised by the St Kilda Council.
- Jacka Park, Wedderburn, Victoria (33.775598°S 151.285118°E) is named in his honour and the gates inscribed with "1914-18 Dedicated to the memory of Cpt. Albert Jacka V.C. M.C. & Bar"
- Plaque in St Kilda Army and Navy Club RSL Sub Branch, 88 Acland Street, St Kilda (37.867466°S 144.978858°E) inscribed "In memory of Captain Albert Jacka V.C., M.C. and bar 1893–1932. served in the 4th Brigade, 14th Battalion – 'Jacka's Mob' Australian Imperial Forces 1914–1920".
- State Forests Department Roll of Honour at Beechworth museum, Victoria.
- Inscription of name on Victoria Cross Memorial in Alfred Square, St Kilda, along with other Victoria Cross recipients from St Kilda. "
- The suburb of Jacka located in Canberra, Australia's national capital, was named in his honour.
- Jacka Boulevard, St Kilda (37.865673°S 144.97344°E) was named in his honour.
