= Bullecourt 1917, Jean and Denise Letaille museum =

Musée Jean et Denise Letaille, Bullecourt 1917
- Established: 25 April 2012
- Location: 1 bis rue d'Arras, 62223 Bullecourt, France
- Coordinates: 50.1931°N 2.9286°E
- Area: 210 sq ft (20 m^{2})

Bullecourt 1917, Jean and Denise Letaille museum, is a French museum, located in Bullecourt. It is a military museum about the First World War, and the nearby Battle of Arras in particular.

The museum is open Tuesday to Sunday from 2:00 p.m. to 6:00 p.m.

== Battles of Bullecourt ==
=== First battle of Bullecourt (10 April 1917) ===
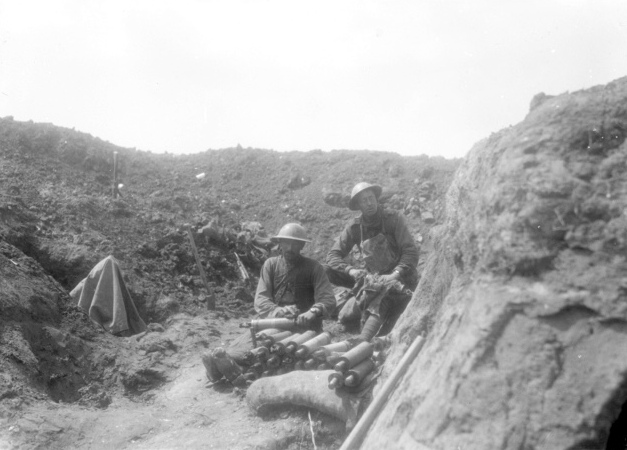
Australian soldiers with a Stokes mortar on 8 May 1917

On 10 April 1917, the 62nd British Division and Australian 4th Division attacked the village of Bullecourt to repel the German enemy. Tanks should support this attack, but they were delayed by bad weather. Two battalions of the West Yorkshire Regiment that didn't know the delaying of the attack were severely touched. On 11 April 1917, only eleven Mark II tanks supported the troops for another assault.

Harry Murray took part in the battle where his friend Percy Black is killed.

=== Second battle of Bullecourt (3 May 1917) ===
After this first failure, a second assault took place from 3 to 21 May 1917. At 3.45 am on 3 May 1917 the attack was launched. However, thanks to their deep underground shelters many Germans escaped the bombardments. Part of the attacking force was exposed to machine guns and many soldiers were killed in No man's land.

After an hour of fighting, the Australians seized a section of the first two German lines. The British 62nd Division attacked the ruined of Bullecourt on the morning of 3 May. Despite the support of ten tanks, the attack failed in the face of the Württemberg division. George Howell was seriously wounded during the fighting. At the end of the battle, the Allies retained a small part of the Hindenburg Line but it was of no tactical significance. The British Army then focused its attention on the battles in Flanders.

=== Results ===
From May 1917 to March 1918, 8,893 British and 10,771 Australians and more than 10,000 Germans were killed. Among the survivors, there were many who would die during later battles in 1917 and 1918.

2,249 Australians and 1,875 British killed in Bullecourt have no known grave. Their names were inscribed on the Villers–Bretonneux Australian National Memorial and on the British Arras Memorial. The remains of many soldiers still lie in the ground of Artois.

Since 1993, the digger monument commemorates the battles of Bullecourt.

== History of the museum ==
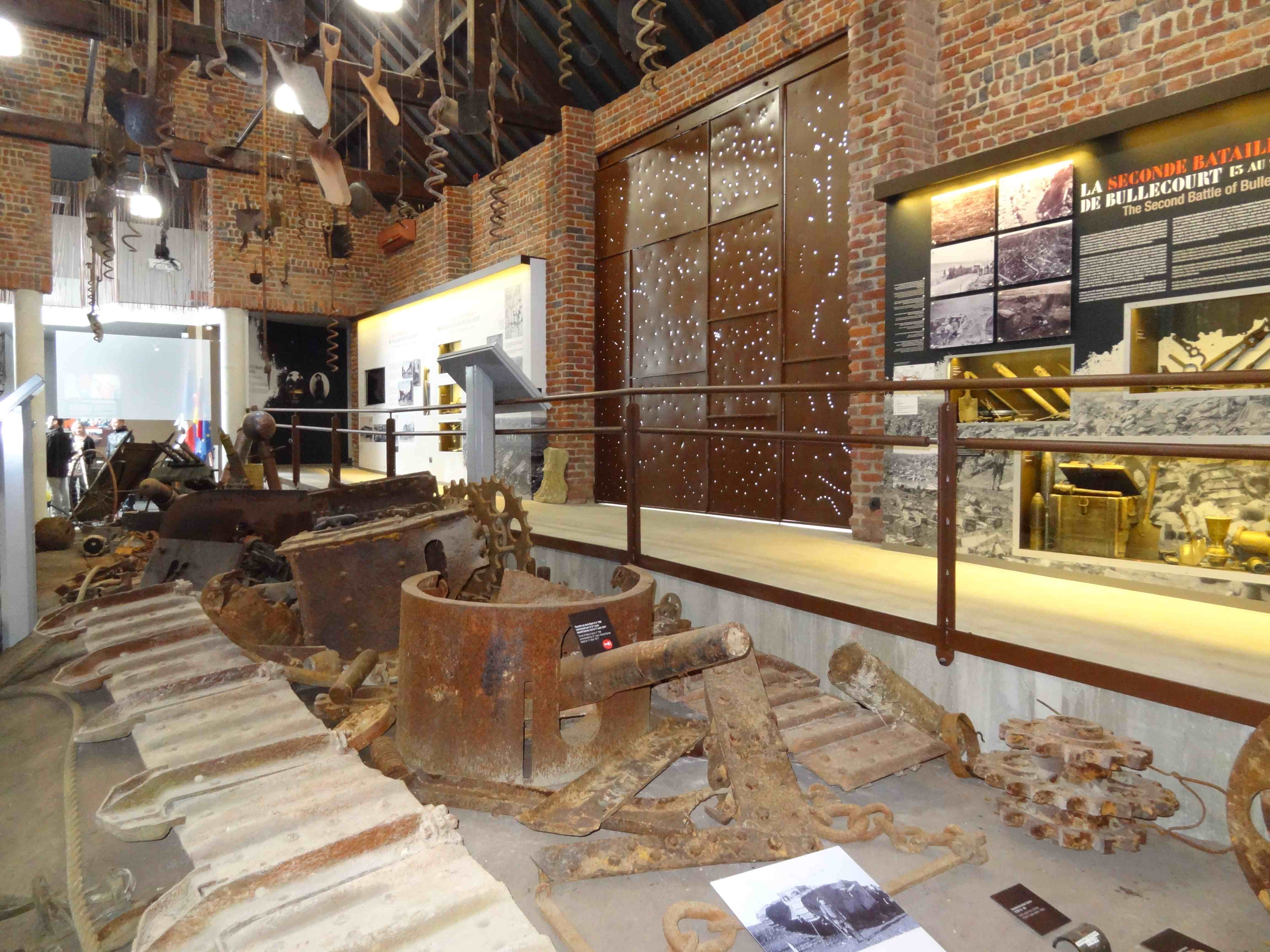
Exhibition space in April 2012

The museum was born from the collection of Jean and Denise Letaille, a farming couple who collected objects found during tillage.

In 2008, the Australian Department of Veterans Affairs wants to upgrade seven sites showing the Australian forces during the First World War (Ypres and Passchendaele in Belgium; Fromelles, Bullecourt, Mont-Saint-Quentin, Pozières and Villers-Bretonneux).

Work began in 2011, funded by the Australian Government, the French General Council of Pas-de-Calais, the Regional Council of Nord-Pas-de-Calais and the local municipalities for €900,000.

The renovated museum opened on 25 April 2012 for Anzac Day.

Jean Letaille died on 10 March 2012, a month and a half before the museum opened (his wife Denise had died in 2004).

== Bibliography ==
- Peter Barton, Arras: The Spring 1917 Offensive in Panoramas Including Vimy Ridge and Bullecourt, Constable, 2010
- Paul Kendall, Bullecourt 1917: Breaching the Hindenburg Line, Éd. The History Press Ltd, 2010
- Graham Keech, Bullecourt : Arras, Éd. Pen & Sword Books Ltd, 1999
