= 26th Battalion (Australia) =

Australian Army infantry battalion

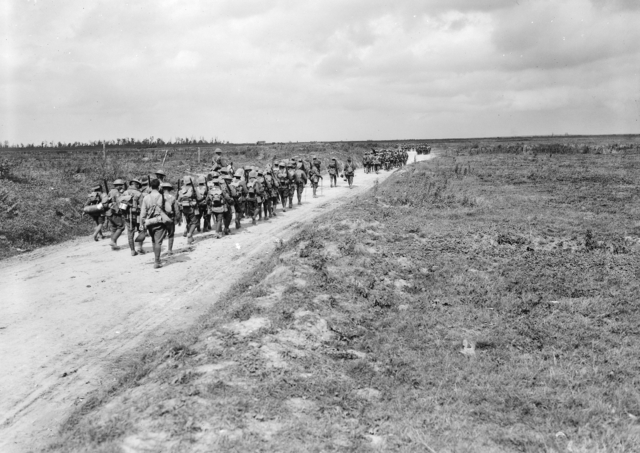
- Troops from the 26th Battalion in Picardie, Somme, August 1918
- Active: 1915–1919; 1921–1946
- Country: Australia
- Branch: Australian Army
- Type: Infantry
- Size: ~800–1,000 personnel all ranks
- Part of: World War I: 7th Brigade, 2nd Division; World War II: 11th Brigade, 3rd Division
- Motto: Nunquam non Paratus (Never Unprepared)
- Colours: Purple over blue
- Engagements: World War I: Gallipoli campaign; Western Front; World War II: New Guinea campaign; Bougainville campaign

Commanders
- Notable commanders: Harry Murray; Bernard Callinan

Insignia
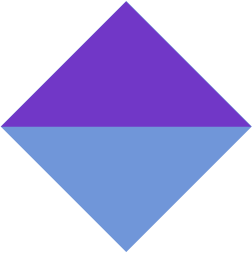
- Unit colour patch

The 26th Battalion was an infantry battalion of the Australian Army. Originally raised in April 1915 for service in World War I as part of the Australian Imperial Force (AIF), it was assigned to the 7th Brigade and consisted of personnel recruited from the states of Queensland, Tasmania and Victoria. The battalion fought at Gallipoli in the latter stages of that campaign before being withdrawn to Egypt in late 1915. In mid-1916, it was sent to Europe where it served in the trenches of the Western Front in France and Belgium for the rest of the war, fighting in most of the battles that the Australians took part in between 1916 and 1918. At the end of the war, it was disbanded in May 1919 as part of the demobilisation of the AIF.

During the inter-war years, the 26th Battalion was re-raised as a part-time unit of the Citizens Forces, known as the 26th Battalion (Logan and Albert Regiment), based in Queensland. In 1934, the 26th was merged with another Queensland-based infantry battalion, the 15th Battalion, to become the 15th/26th Battalion. The two units were subsequently delinked in 1939 when the new 26th Australian Infantry Battalion was raised in Queensland as Australia mobilised for war.

The battalion was assigned to the 11th Brigade at this time and used in various garrison roles in the early part of World War II before a detachment was sent to the Dutch East Indies as part of Merauke Force in 1943. Later in the war, the entire 26th Battalion, along with the rest of the 11th Brigade, was committed to the Bougainville campaign where they saw action against the Japanese from late 1944 until the end of hostilities in August 1945. After the war, the 26th Battalion was used to guard Japanese prisoners on Rabaul, remaining there until March 1946, before returning to Australia for demobilisation. It was subsequently disbanded in August 1946.

== History ==
=== World War I ===
The 26th Battalion was originally raised in April 1915 as part of the all-volunteer Australian Imperial Force (AIF). Drawing recruits from Tasmania, Queensland and Victoria, the battalion concentrated at Enoggera, Queensland, where it formed part of the 7th Brigade, which was attached to the 2nd Division. The battalion's first commanding officer was Lieutenant Colonel George Ferguson. With an authorised strength of 1,023 men, after a short period of basic training, the battalion's first draft – consisting of two companies of Queenslanders – embarked for overseas in May. They were followed by the two Tasmanian companies in late June. Further training was undertaken in Egypt, after which the battalion was sent to Gallipoli when the 2nd Division was despatched to the peninsula to reinforce the troops that had been fighting there since April. The 26th Battalion landed on 12 September. By that time, the campaign had become a costly stalemate and shortly after their arrival, as winter came and conditions worsened, the decision was made to evacuate the peninsula. As a result, the battalion did not take part in any major actions, and fulfilled only a defensive role, defending positions such as "Courtney's Post", "Steel's Post" and "Russell's Top", before it was withdrawn from the peninsula on 12 December. Casualties during this first campaign amounted to 26 killed and 96 wounded. Over 500 personnel were also evacuated as sick with about half returning to duty.

After the evacuation, the 26th Battalion returned to Egypt where the AIF was reorganised and expanded before being sent to Europe. The 26th arrived in France in March 1916, taking its place in the trenches along the Western Front the following month. In early June, alongside the 28th Battalion, they took part in the first raid undertaken by Australians in France, attacking German trenches around Bois Grenier. Their first major battle came around Pozières between July and August, after which the battalion was sent along with the entire 2nd Division to a quieter sector in Belgium having suffered over 650 casualties. After this, in November they were moved south to the Somme Valley and throughout the month the 26th participated in two attacks around a position known as "The Maze", a salient to the east of Flers. Both of these attacks ultimately proved fruitless, grinding to a halt in the muddy conditions, and resulting in over 300 casualties. At the end of November, Lieutenant Colonel Reginald Travers took command of the battalion.

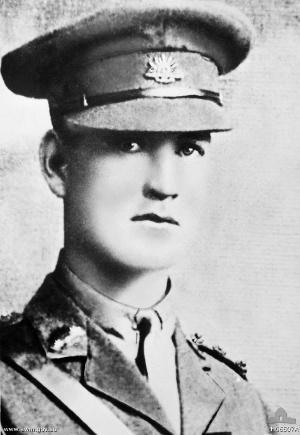
Percy Cherry, one of the 26th Battalion's two Victoria Cross recipients

The harsh winter of 1916–17 was spent occupying defensive positions along the front and training behind the lines. Christmas was spent in the trenches around Amiens, but in early January 1917, the 26th Battalion was transferred to the Ancre Valley and then to Le Sars later in the month. As the German Army withdrew towards the Hindenburg Line, the 26th was involved in a number of actions at Warlencourt and Lagnicourt in March. During the fighting around Lagnicourt, Captain Percy Cherry led his company into the village, capturing several positions before helping to hold off several German counterattacks; he was later awarded the Victoria Cross posthumously. Later, in May they joined the Second Battle of Bullecourt, where they were used mainly in a support role during the initial attack, being held back as part of the 2nd Division's reserve. During the attack, a company from the 26th was detached to help bolster the 5th Brigade, and later it was thrust into the line to help defend the gains after a German counterattack fell on the 6th Brigade's left flank. After Bullecourt, the battalion was moved to Belgium again, where they joined the battles at Menin Road and Brooseinde Ridge in September and October. During the first attack, the 26th was in support of the 28th Battalion, but later it led the 7th Brigade's follow up attack on the second line of defences around Broodseinde. Combined casualties for the two battles were over 400 killed or wounded.

In early 1918, after the fighting on the Eastern Front ended following the collapse of the Russian Empire, the Germans transferred a large number of divisions to the Western Front and subsequently launched a major offensive that became known as the Spring Offensive. In April 1918, after the Allies had been pushed steadily back, the 26th Battalion was transferred from the Messines sector south to the Somme and committed to the fighting along with other Australian units. The 26th undertook defensive tasks throughout April and May in various locations including Baizieux, Camon and Ribemont, during which time over 100 casualties were suffered before the German offensive was eventually halted. After this, throughout June and July the battalion launched a number of "peaceful penetration" operations to take small amounts of the German front line during the lull that followed prior to the final Allied offensive of the war. The first came around Morlancourt on 10 June, while another was undertaken around Monument Wood, near Villers-Bretonneux, on 17 July 1918. It was during this raid that Lieutenant Albert Borella earned the battalion's second Victoria Cross of the war. On 22 July, thirteen men of the battalion accompanied 23 men of the British 1st Gun Carrier Company in taking possession of and towing away the abandoned German A7V tank "Mephisto" from within Allied lines. In August, the Allies launched their Hundred Days Offensive, which ultimately brought an end to the war. On the opening day of the offensive, the 26th led the 7th Brigade's attack around Villers-Bretonneux. After a period in reserve, in late August they advanced on the brigade's left during an attack at Biaches which saw the Allies push towards the Somme River. The following month they took part in the attack on Mont St Quentin, during which they experienced heavy machine-gun fire.

After the Somme was crossed, the 26th joined an attack around Grandcourt and Lormisset on 3 October 1918, part of the "Beaurevoir Line", which was the third and final line of the Hindenburg Line defences. During the attack, the 26th followed up the initial gains made in the 7th Brigade's sector by the 25th Battalion, and attacked the second line of German defences around Grandcourt, suffering 123 casualties, including 21 killed. Shortly after this, the 26th received a batch of reinforcements from the 25th Battalion, which was subsequently disbanded. Nevertheless, the fighting along the Beaurevoir Line was the 26th Battalion's last contribution to the war and they were withdrawn to Berteaucort for a rest shortly afterwards. They did not return to the front line before the armistice was declared in November and were subsequently disbanded on 31 May 1919. The battalion's last commanding officer was Lieutenant Colonel William Davis, who took command of the battalion in mid-October 1918 and remained in command until it was disbanded.

During the course of the 26th Battalion's involvement in the war it lost 877 men killed and 2,745 men wounded. Members of the battalion received the following decorations: two Victoria Crosses (VCs), one Member of the Order of the British Empire (MBE), four Distinguished Service Orders (DSOs) including one Bar, 25 Distinguished Conduct Medals (DCMs), 26 Military Crosses (MCs) including three Bars, 96 Military Medals (MMs) including four Bars, four Meritorious Service Medals (MSMs), and 37 Mentions in Despatches (MIDs).

=== Inter-war years ===
In 1921, following the completion of the demobilisation process, the AIF was disbanded and the Citizens Forces, Australia's part-time military force which was responsible for the defence of Australia, was reorganised to perpetuate the battle honours and traditions of the AIF by renumbering the units of the Citizens Force to adopt the numerical designations of their related AIF units. This process had partially commenced in late 1918, with the introduction of a regimental system within the Citizen Forces, but was adjusted in 1921 when the Citizens Force was reorganised to replicate the AIF's divisional structure resulting in the formation of single battalions from each regiment. Upon formation during the war, the units of the AIF had been raised from men drawn from the recruitment territory of already established Citizens Force units and as a consequence many AIF units retained links to Citizens Force units from where they drew the majority of the initial intake of personnel. As a result of the reorganisation in 1921, the 26th Battalion was re-raised as a part-time unit of the Citizens Force, drawing personnel from several battalions of the 26th Infantry Regiment, which traced its history back through the 9th (Logan and Albert) Infantry, which had been formed in 1912. In 1927, territorial titles were adopted by the units of the Citizens Force, and the battalion adopted the title of the "Logan and Albert Regiment". It also adopted the motto, Nunquam non Paratus, meaning "Never Unprepared".

Initially, the Citizens Forces was maintained using a mixture of voluntary and compulsory service. In 1929, following the election of the Scullin Labor government, the compulsory training scheme was abolished and replaced with an all volunteer force known as the "Militia". The decision to suspend compulsory training, coupled with the economic downturn of the Great Depression meant that the manpower of many Militia units dropped considerably and the decision was made to amalgamate a number of units. The 26th Battalion was not initially affected, but in 1934 it was merged with the 15th Battalion to form the 15th/26th Battalion. These two battalions remained linked until just prior to World War II, when on 16 June 1939, they were split and a new 26th Battalion was raised in Queensland, near Hughenden, within the 1st Military District. Upon re-forming, the battalion was placed under the command of one of the Australian Army's most decorated soldiers, Lieutenant Colonel Harry Murray, a World War I Victoria Cross recipient. The battalion's second-in-command was another Victoria Cross recipient, Major Edgar Towner.

=== World War II ===
Following the outbreak of World War II in September 1939, the 26th Battalion undertook a series of training camps around northern Queensland as it began to re-establish its numbers. On 4 September 1939 the battalion marched into camp at Kissing Point, Townsville where they remained until moving to Townsville Showgrounds on 6 November 1939, and then south of Bowen on 23 March 1940. At this time, it was placed under the command of the 11th Brigade, along with the 31st and 51st Battalions, both of which were Queensland-based Militia battalions. In mid-1940, the battalion's strength fluctuated as compulsory service was reintroduced and drafts of national servicemen marched in for short periods of training, while volunteers were released to join the Second Australian Imperial Force (2nd AIF) and other services. Many of the initial recruits came from Italian-Australian families from north Queensland, but as the battalion grew, reinforcements from other Australian states arrived during 1942 and early 1943.

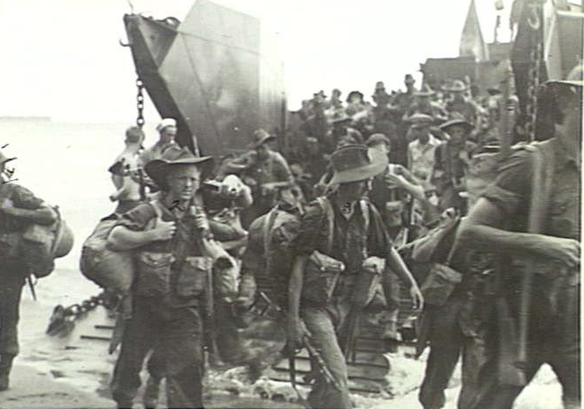
Troops from the 26th Battalion landing around Tsimba, February 1945

Throughout 1941 and 1942, the battalion undertook defensive duties in various locations around Queensland, including Charters Towers, Bohle River, and Alligator Falls. On 17 August 1942, Murray relinquished command and was replaced by Lieutenant Colonel John Abbott. In October, the 26th moved to Kuranda, near Barron Falls, and as reinforcements arrived, began training to prepare for deployment overseas. In May 1943, the battalion moved to Cairns where they embarked on the transport Katoomba and sailed to Horn Island. 'A' Company was detached at this time to Merauke Force in the Dutch East Indies, becoming the first Militia unit to serve outside of Australian territory. Several other platoons were dispatched to other islands around the Torres Strait. Between August 1943 and November, defensive duties were undertaken on the mainland around the Cape York Peninsula, before the battalion returned to Horn Island.

In July 1944, the 26th Battalion was withdrawn to Australia on board the transport Taroona, and after leave reconstituted at Strathpine, Queensland, and began training for further operations. Gazetted as an AIF unit, which meant it could be deployed outside Australian territory, during December 1944 the battalion deployed to Bougainville as Australian troops from the 3rd Division relieved American forces around Torokina. The Australians subsequently launched three drives on the island in the northern, southern and central areas. Initially, the 26th Battalion was committed to the fighting in the central sector of the island conducting patrolling operations around Numa Numa before being withdrawn to Torokina at the end of January 1945. In February that year, Lieutenant Colonel Bernard Callinan assumed command, taking over from Abbott.

The 26th was then deployed to the Soraken Plantation area, using a series of amphibious landings to clear the area before a brief rest after which they began clearing north towards Ratsua and Ruri Bay, taking over from the 55th/53rd Battalion. Determined Japanese resistance along the Ratsua front resulted in an amphibious landing by a company from the 31st/51st Battalion around Porton Plantation, in an effort to outflank Ratsua. Following a series of mishaps, the company that landed around Porton became heavily engaged, and while efforts were made to evacuate them, the 26th Battalion and the rest of the 31st/51st Battalion attempted to break through from Ratsua. They were unable to penetrate the Japanese lines, however, as they came up against Japanese defenders that were determined to resist because they were unable to withdraw any further along the peninsula. In late June, the 26th Battalion was relieved by the 27th Battalion and sent back to Torokina for rest. Hostilities ceased in August, and the following month the 26th Battalion was sent to Rabaul for garrison duty. In December, Lieutenant Colonel Allan Cameron took command of the battalion.

In March 1946, the 26th Battalion returned to Australia. After this, the battalion experienced a high turn-over of personnel, with over 2,500 men passing through the battalion at this time, as men were discharged or transferred to other units. Command of the battalion also changed a couple of times, with Lieutenant Colonel Peter Webster taking over on 22 March, before he handed over to Lieutenant Colonel Eric Barnes. The battalion was finally disbanded on 28 August 1946, but 'A' Company remained in existence as a holding company until 25 September 1946 when the last member marched out.

During the course of the battalion's involvement in the war, it lost 40 men killed in action or died on active service and 110 wounded. Members of the battalion received the following decorations: one DSO, two MBEs, one George Medal, one British Empire Medal, five MCs, eight MMs, and 14 MIDs.

== Alliances ==
The 26th Battalion held the following alliances:

- United Kingdom – Cameronians (Scottish Rifles) (1928–51);
- Canada – The Perth Regiment (1932–53);
- New Zealand – The Otago Regiment (1932–54);
- South Africa – Witwatersrand Rifles (1932–53).

== Commanding officers ==
The following officers commanded the 26th Battalion:

World War I

- Lieutenant Colonel George Andrew Ferguson;
- Lieutenant Colonel Reginald John Albert Travers;
- Lieutenant Colonel William MacIntyre Davis.

World War II

- Lieutenant Colonel Henry William (Harry) Murray;
- Lieutenant Colonel John Noel Abbott;
- Lieutenant Colonel Bernard James Callinan;
- Lieutenant Colonel Allan Gordon Cameron;
- Lieutenant Colonel Peter Glyn Clifton Webster;
- Lieutenant Colonel Eric Barnes.

== Battle honours ==
The 26th Battalion was awarded the following battle honours:

- World War I: Somme 1916, '18; Pozières; Bullecourt; Ypres 1917; Menin Road; Polygon Wood; Broodseinde; Poelcappelle; Passchendaele; Amiens; Albert 1918; Mont St Quentin; Hindenburg Line; Beaurevoir; France and Flanders 1916–18; Gallipoli 1915; Egypt 1915–16.
- World War II: Bonis–Porton; South-West Pacific 1943–45; Liberation of Australian New Guinea.

In 1961, the battalion – although no longer on the Australian Army's order of battle – was entrusted with the three battle honours awarded to the 2/26th Battalion for its service with the 2nd AIF during World War II. The honours it inherited at this time were: Malaya 1941–42; Johore; and Singapore Island.
