= Bullecourt =

- Commune
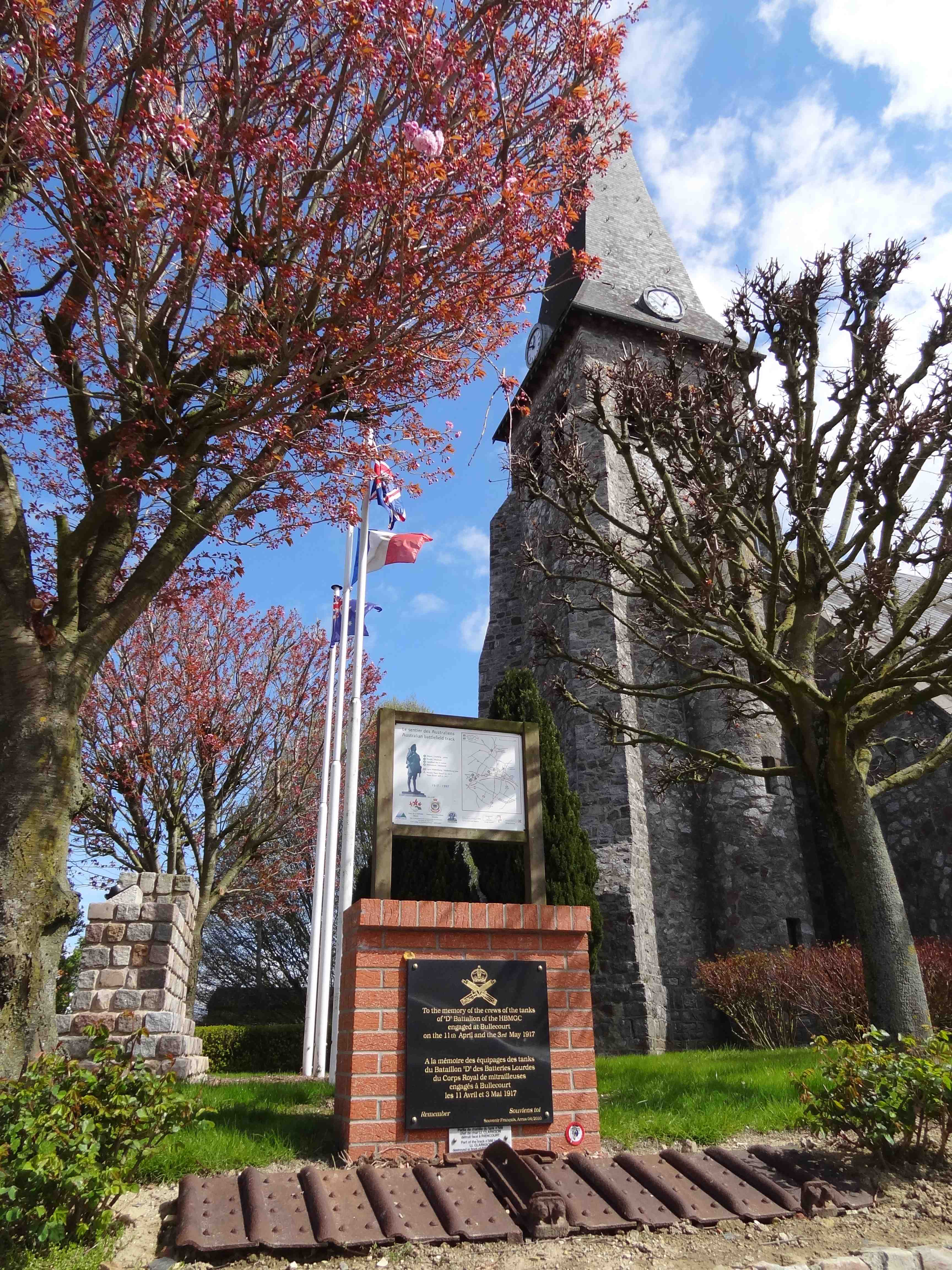
- The church and Souvenir Français monument, in Bullecourt

- Coat of arms
- Location of Bullecourt
- Location within France Location within Hauts-de-France
- Coordinates: 50°11′35″N 2°55′43″E
- Country: France
- Region: Hauts-de-France
- Department: Pas-de-Calais
- Arrondissement: Arras
- Canton: Bapaume
- Intercommunality: CC Sud-Artois

Government
  - Mayor (2020–2026): Eric Bianchin
- Area^{1}: 6.43 km^{2} (2.48 sq mi)
- Elevation: 92 m (302 ft)
- Highest elevation: 104 m (341 ft)
- Lowest elevation: 74 m (243 ft)
- Population (2023): 225
  - Density: 35.0/km^{2} (90.6/sq mi)
- Time zone: UTC+01:00 (CET)
  - Summer (DST): UTC+02:00 (CEST)
- INSEE/Postal code: 62185 /62128
- ^{1} French Land Register data, which excludes lakes, ponds, glaciers > 1 km^{2} (0.386 sq mi or 247 acres) and river estuaries.

Bullecourt (French pronunciation: [bylkuʁ]) is a commune in the Pas-de-Calais department in the Hauts-de-France region region of northern France.

== Geography ==
Bullecourt is situated on the Upper Cretaceous plain of Artois between Arras and Bapaume, east of the A1 motorway. satellite photograph The nearby village of Quéant is located near the eastern edge. The A1 motorway and the high-speed (TGV) railway line run along the western edge. To the south of Bullecourt, a now-closed local railway line runs from east to west.

== Population ==
Historical population
Year	Pop.	±% p.a.
1968	264	—
1975	245	−1.06%
1982	248	+0.17%
1990	260	+0.59%
1999	251	−0.39%
2007	242	−0.46%
2012	248	+0.49%
2017	236	−0.99%
2023	225	−0.79%
Source: INSEE

== Transportation ==
Bullecourt is located within the triangle formed by the A1, A2, and A26 motorways, and by the N17, N30, and D939 roads.

== History ==
Archaeological remains from the Gallo-Roman period have been found in the area. The village was first mentioned in 1096 under the name "Bullecortis".

In 620, it was the birthplace of Saint Vindicien, a follower of Saint Eligius, known in French as Saint Eloi. Vindicien successively became bishop of Arras and bishop of Cambrai. He is considered the founder of the abbey named after his mentor, Mont St Eloi, of which Bullecourt became a lordship.

The village has been completely destroyed by war twice: in 1543 during the Ninth Italian War (1542–1546) and in 1917, during the First World War.

The remains of Hindenburg Line at Bullecourt (as seen after the war, in 1920).

In early 1917, during the northern hemisphere spring, the First attack on Bullecourt (11 April 1917) and the Battle of Bullecourt (3–17 May 1917) became significant events, particularly in the military history of Australia. The village was located at the southern end of an active front and formed part of the Hindenburg Line. In the First Battle of Bullecourt, two brigades of the 4th Australian Division attacked German positions in Bullecourt, supported by 12 tanks but lacking artillery support. Under heavy fire, the Australians were forced to retreat. The 4th Australian Brigade sustained 2,258 casualties (killed, wounded, or taken prisoner) out of approximately 3,000 infantry. German losses were 750 killed, and they captured 27 Australian officers and 1,137 other ranks. In the subsequent Battle of Bullecourt, an attack on both flanks of the village was carried out by the 2nd Australian Division and the 62nd (2nd West Riding) Division. Bullecourt was recaptured, but the anticipated breakthrough on the Hindenburg Line did not occur. Total Australian and British casualties amounted to 14,000. The Musée Jean et Denise Letaille (established in 2012) commemorates this fighting.

== Sights ==
In addition to numerous bunkers and dugouts from the Hindenburg Line period, there is also an underground shelter dating from the 17th century.

The church of St. Vlaast was rebuilt after 1918.

There is a museum displaying objects collected from the World War periods.

== Economy and village life ==
The economy is primarily agricultural, involving general farming and cattle raising. The village has an agricultural co-operative.

The village festival is held on the first Sunday of June, and a festival in honour of the Australians takes place on the last Saturday in April.

== See also ==
- Communes of the Pas-de-Calais department
