= Remembrance Driveway (Australia) =

Roadside memorials in Australia

Remembrance Driveway New South Wales–Australian Capital Territory

- Coordinates: 33°51′48″S 151°12′36″E (NE end); 35°16′50″S 149°8′57″E (SW end)

General information
- Type: Road
- Opened: 5 February 1954

Major junctions
- NE end: Macquarie Place; Sydney central business district
- SW end: Treloar Crescent; Australian War Memorial, Canberra

Highway system
- Highways in Australia; National Highway • Freeways in Australia; Highways in New South Wales; Road infrastructure in Canberra

Remembrance Driveway
- Australia
- The Remembrance Driveway in Canberra, from a view on the steps of the Australian War Memorial.
- Used for those deceased
- Established: 5 February 1954
- Location: Between Macquarie Place, Sydney and the Australian War Memorial, Canberra

The Remembrance Driveway in Australia is a road and memorial system of arboreal parks, plantations, and road-side rest areas that provide a living memorial in honour of those who served in the Australian Defence Forces in World War II, the Korean War, Malayan Emergency and the Vietnam War, and who continue to serve around the world. The most prominent feature of the driveway are a series of rest areas dedicated in honour of the Australian Victoria Cross recipients from World War II onwards.

== Route ==
The northeastern terminus of the Remembrance Driveway is in Macquarie Place, Sydney, and follows the 320-kilometre (200 mi) Hume Highway, Hume Motorway, a small section of the Old Hume Highway, and Federal Highway between Sydney, the state capital of New South Wales, and Canberra, the national capital, where its southwestern terminus is at Remembrance Park, adjacent to the Australian War Memorial.

The Remembrance Driveway was instituted in 1954 when Queen Elizabeth II and the Duke of Edinburgh marked the beginning of the Driveway by planting two plane trees in Macquarie Place.

=== Rest areas ===
The Victoria Cross rest areas and memorial parks sited along the Driveway honour the 24 Australian World War II and Vietnam War Victoria Cross winners.

| Road | State/Terr. | Location | Rest area name | Established | Coordinates | Honouree | Notes |
|---|---|---|---|---|---|---|---|
| Ash Road, north of Camden Valley Way | NSW | Prestons | Sir Roden Cutler VC | 2006 | 33°57′11″S 150°52′25″E | Sir Roden Cutler VC, AK, KCMG, KCVO, CBE | |
| Hume Motorway | NSW | Menangle | Partridge VC | 2003 | 34°09′25″S 150°44′19″E | Frank Partridge VC | |
| Hume Motorway | NSW | Pheasants Nest | Kenna VC | 2012 | 34°14′47″S 150°39′30″E | Edward Kenna VC | |
| Hume Highway | NSW | Sutton Forest | Gordon VC | 2001 | 34°32′07″S 150°16′53″E | Jim Gordon VC | |
| Hume Highway | NSW | Moss Vale | Mackey VC | 2001 | 34°34′44″S 150°15′12″E | Jack Mackey VC | |
| Hume Highway | NSW | Penrose | Kingsbury VC | 1995 | 34°37′10″S 150°12′48″E | Bruce Kingsbury VC | |
| Hume Highway | NSW | Marulan | Chowne VC | 1997 | 34°44′11″S 149°49′49″E | Albert Chowne VC, MM | |
| Hume Highway | NSW | Marulan | Derrick VC | 1999 | 34°44′38″S 149°53′13″E | Tom Derrick VC, DCM | |
| Hume Highway | NSW | Yarra | French VC | 1996 | 34°47′13″S 149°38′23″E | Jack French VC | |
| Hume Highway | NSW | Yarra | Kibby VC | 1996 | 34°48′56″S 149°36′15″E | Bill Kibby VC | |
| Federal Highway | NSW | Collector | Edmonson VC | 1995 | 34°53′44″S 149°30′38″E | John Edmondson VC | |
| Federal Highway | NSW | Collector | Gratwick VC | 1996 | 34°54′42″S 149°26′34″E | Percy Gratwick VC | |
| Federal Highway | NSW | Lake George | Gurney VC | 1995 | 34°59′59″S 149°22′57″E | Stan Gurney VC | |
| Federal Highway | NSW | Lake George | Badcoe VC | 1998/99 | 35°02′07″S 149°22′40″E | Peter Badcoe VC | |
| Federal Highway | NSW | Lake George | Wheatley VC | 1998/99 | 35°04′02″S 149°22′27″E | Kevin Wheatley VC | |
| Federal Highway | NSW | Lake George | Anderson VC | 1998/99 | 35°06′03″S 149°22′36″E | Charles Anderson VC, MC | |
| Federal Highway | NSW | Bywong | Middleton VC | 1997 | 35°08′36″S 149°20′02″E | Ron Middleton VC | |
| Federal Highway | NSW | Bywong | Newton VC | 1997 | 35°08′37″S 149°20′04″E | Bill Newton VC | |
| Federal Highway | ACT | Majura | Edwards VC | 2000 | 35°12′41″S 149°11′25″E | Sir Hughie Edwards VC, KCMG, CB, DSO, OBE, DFC | |
| Treloar Crescent | ACT | Campbell, (AWM) | Kelliher VC | 2002 | 35°16′45″S 149°09′01″E | Richard Kelliher VC | |
| Treloar Crescent | ACT | Campbell, (AWM) | Rattey VC | 2002 | 35°16′45″S 149°09′01″E | Reg Rattey VC | |
| Treloar Crescent | ACT | Campbell, (AWM) | Simpson VC | 2005 | 35°16′45″S 149°09′01″E | Ray Simpson VC, DCM | |
| Treloar Crescent | ACT | Campbell, (AWM) | Starcevich VC | 2005 | 35°16′45″S 149°09′01″E | Tom Starcevich VC | |

== See also ==
- Military history of Australia
