= Hollywood Private Hospital =

Hospital in Perth, Western Australia

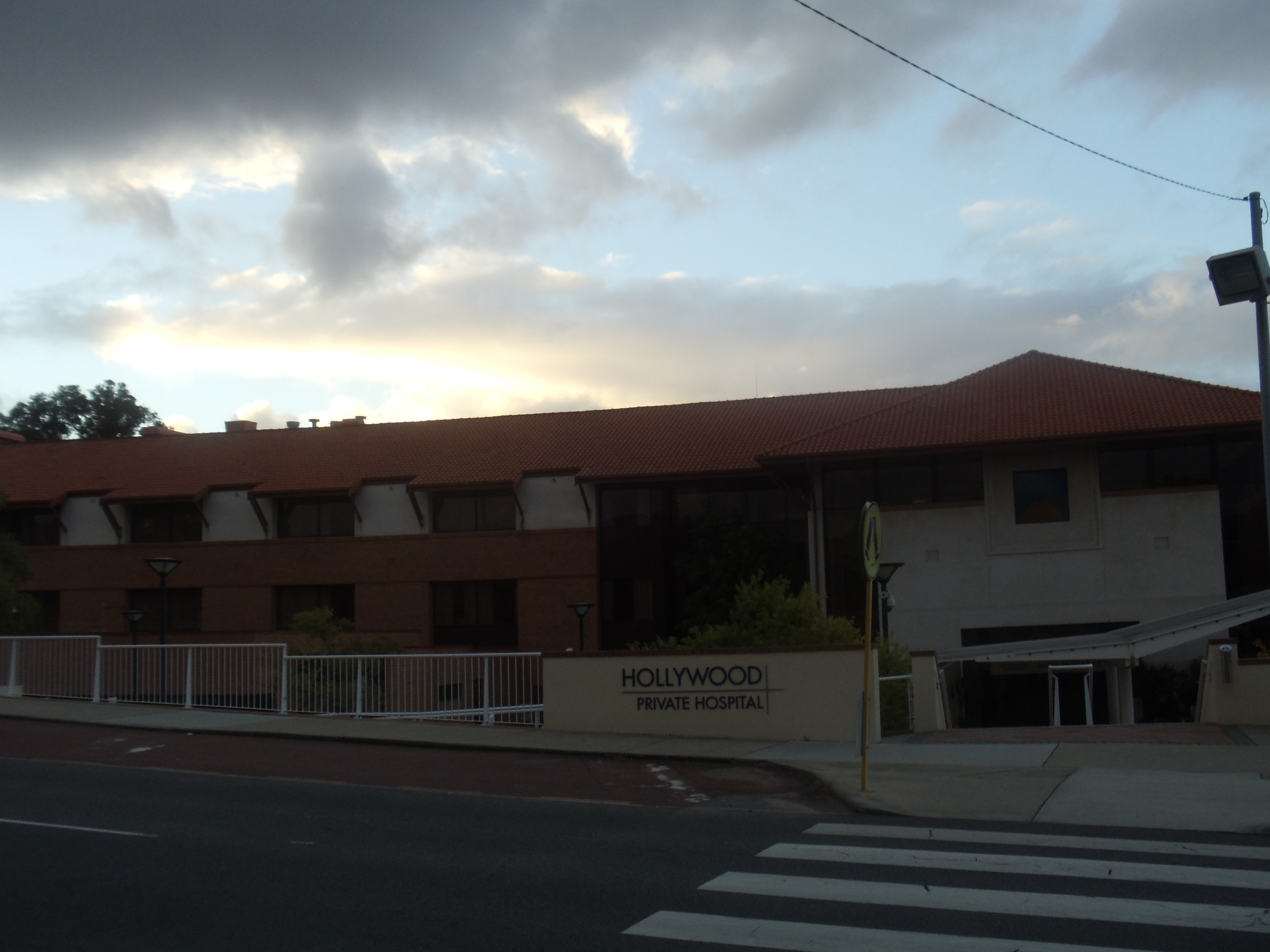

Geography
- Location: Monash Avenue, Nedlands, City of Nedlands, Western Australia, Australia
- Coordinates: 31°58′12″S 115°48′32″E

Organisation
- Care system: Private

Services
- Beds: 900

History
- Founded: 1942; 84 years ago

Links
- Website: www.hollywoodprivate.com.au
- Lists: Hospitals in Australia

Hollywood Private Hospital (Hollywood) is an acute care hospital located in Nedlands, Western Australia. Hollywood is Western Australia's largest private hospital, with more than 900 licensed beds. The hospital is part of Ramsay Health Care Group and has more than 800 accredited specialists working across a wide range of disciplines including cardiology, gastroenterology, general medicine, general surgery, oncology, orthopaedics, palliative care, psychiatry, rehabilitation and urology. Hollywood employs over 2,000 people and has 75,000 patient admissions each year.

== Specialties ==
Hollywood offers a wide range of comprehensive specialties, including

- aged care and rehabilitation,
- bariatric/obesity surgery,
- cardiology,
- cardiology – interventional,
- colorectal surgery,
- dermatology,
- ear nose and throat,
- endocrinology,
- gastroenterology,
- general medicine,
- general surgery,
- gynaecological oncology,
- gynaecology,
- haematology,
- infectious diseases,
- neurology,
- neurosurgery,
- nuclear medicine,
- oncology,
- orthopaedics,
- paediatric surgery,
- pain medicine,
- palliative care,
- plastic and reconstructive surgery,
- psychiatry,
- rehabilitation,
- renal medicine,
- respiratory,
- rheumatology,
- urology and
- vascular surgery.

== History ==
- 1942 - 110 Military Hospital
- 1947 - Repatriation General Hospital, Hollywood; Jean Elsie Ferguson, matron
- 1994 - Purchased by the Ramsay Health Care Group and commenced operations as Hollywood Private Hospital on 24 February 1994
- 1997 - Opening of The Hollywood Clinic
- 2002 - Opening of Sylvia Perry Wing containing the John Carroll and Clifford Sadlier Wards
- 2009 - Opening of Marjorie Brislee Wing containing the Hugh Edwards, Leslie Starcevich, Mark Donaldson, Percival Gratwick and George Gosse Wards
- 2016 - Opening of Anne Leach Wing containing the Jim Gordon, Stan Gurney and George Howell Wards
- 2020 - The Hollywood Clinic Expansion
- 2021 - Opening of the Hollywood Consulting Centre
- 2021 - Opening of the new Sylvia Perry Wing containing the Martin O’Meara, Lawrence McCarthy, and Arthur Bagot Wards. The Emergency Department also opened.

== Building ==
The hospital contains four wings: the Anne Leach Wing, Marjorie Brislee Wing, Vivian Bullwinkel Wing and the Sylvia Perry Wing.

All wards and units are named after Western Australians who were awarded the Victoria Cross and George Cross:

- Charles Pope Ward (Victoria Cross)
- Clifford Sadlier Ward (Victoria Cross)
- Frederick Bell Unit (Victoria Cross)
- George Gosse Ward (George Cross)
- Henry Murray Ward (Victoria Cross)
- Hugh Edwards Ward (Victoria Cross)
- Jim Gordon Ward (Victoria Cross)
- James Woods Ward (Victoria Cross)
- John Carroll Ward (Victoria Cross)
- Lawrence McCarthy Ward (Victoria Cross)
- Leon Goldsworthy Ward (George Cross)
- Leslie Starcevich Ward (Victoria Cross)
- Martin O'Meara Ward (Victoria Cross)
- Percival Gratwick Ward (Victoria Cross)
- Stan Gurney Ward (Victoria Cross)
- Thomas Axford Ward (Victoria Cross)
- Mark Donaldson Ward (Victoria Cross)

The Hollywood Clinic has the following:

- Fenwick Day Unit - named after Ethel Gordon Fenwick
- THC Edis - named after Dot (Margaret Dorothy) Edis
- THC Ferguson - named after Jean Ferguson
- THC Nickoll - named after Molly (Emily Mary) Nickoll

== See also ==
- List of hospitals in Western Australia
