= Ron Middleton =

Ron Middleton may refer to:

- Ron Middleton (American football) (born 1965), American football coach and former player
- Ron Middleton (VC) (1916–1942), bomber pilot in the Royal Australian Air Force and a posthumous recipient of the Victoria Cross
