= Jean Elsie Ferguson =

Australian Army nurse and hospital matron

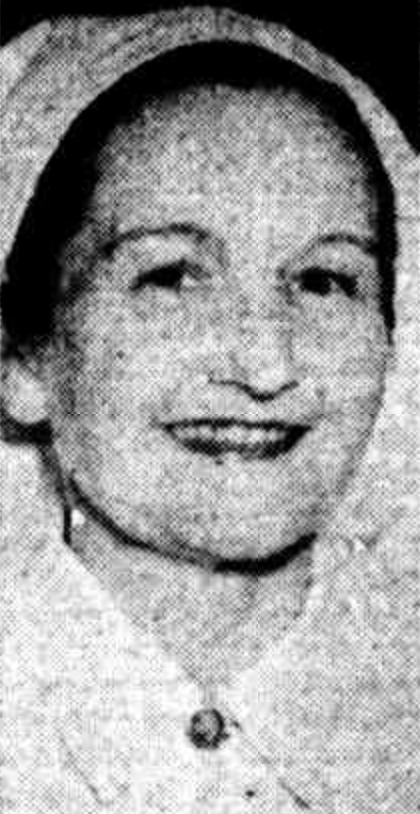
- Born: Jean Elsie Robinson; 15 July 1909; Guildford, Western Australia
- Died: 30 January 1979 (aged 69); Nedlands, Western Australia
- Occupations: Army nurse and matron

Jean Elsie Ferguson MBE ARRC (15 July 1909 – 30 January 1979) was an Australian Army nurse who served in World War II and later became matron of a repatriation hospital in Perth.

== Early life and education ==
Ferguson was born on 15 July 1909 in the Perth suburb of Guildford, the sixth child of John Frederick Geary and Elsie Sarah (née Coppin) Robinson. Ferguson was educated at Perth College, then trained as a nurse at Royal Perth Hospital from 1930 to 1933.

== Career ==
Ferguson worked in Perth hospitals after graduating and joined the Australian Army Nursing Service Reserve in January 1939. In April 1940 she was appointed staff nurse in the Australian Imperial Force (AIF) and was sent to England where she served in the 2nd/3rd Australian General Hospital, Godalming, Surrey. From there she was sent to the Middle East in 1941 and was then sent back to Australia in 1942, to work at Warwick and Toowoomba military hospitals.

Ferguson married Captain John Boyd Ferguson, AIF, in February 1943. He was killed in an accident in September 1943 while serving in New Guinea. Ferguson was herself posted to New Guinea in October 1943. In 1945 she was posted to the 110th Military Hospital in Nedlands, Western Australia. It became a rehabilitation hospital in 1947, where Ferguson was matron and was later renamed the Hollywood Private Hospital.

== Awards and honours ==
In the 1953 Queen's Birthday Honours, Ferguson was made an Associate of the Royal Red Cross (ARRC).

Ferguson was appointed MBE in the 1963 Queen's Birthday Honours and in 1969 she was one of the recipients of the Florence Nightingale Medal.

== Death ==
Ferguson died on 30 January 1979 in Hollywood Private Hospital, Nedlands, Western Australia. She had not remarried.
