= George Howell (soldier) =

Recipient of the Victoria Cross

George Julian Howell VC MM
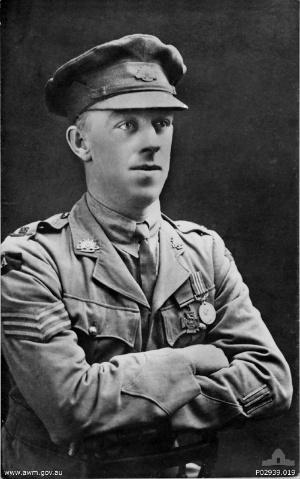
- Sergeant George Howell c.1917
- Born: 19 November 1893; Enfield, New South Wales
- Died: 23 December 1964 (aged 71); Perth, Western Australia
- Military career
- Allegiance: Australia; United States
- Branch: Australian Imperial Force; Citizens Military Force; United States Sea Transport Service
- Service years: 1915–1918; 1939–1941; 1944–1945
- Rank: Staff Sergeant
- Nickname: "Snowy"
- Conflicts: First World War; Gallipoli campaign; Western Front; Battle of the Somme; Battle of Pozières; Battle of Arras; Second World War; Philippines campaign; Battle of Leyte
- Awards: Victoria Cross; Military Medal

George Julian "Snowy" Howell, VC, MM (19 November 1893 – 23 December 1964) was an Australian recipient of the Victoria Cross, the highest decoration for gallantry "in the face of the enemy" that can be awarded to members of the British and Commonwealth armed forces. Howell was decorated with the Victoria Cross following his actions during the Second Battle of Bullecourt, in which he ran along the parapet of a trench bombing the German forces attacking his position through the use of grenades, and thus driving them back.

Born in a suburb of Sydney, New South Wales, Howell was employed as a builder before enlisting in the Australian Imperial Force in June 1915. Allotted to the force's 1st Battalion, he served at Gallipoli prior to transferring to the Western Front. Participating in the Somme offensive of 1916, Howell was wounded at Pozières and promoted to corporal in early 1917. During an attack on a German held village, he led a rifle bombing section and was awarded the Military Medal for his actions. Severely wounded in his Victoria Cross action, Howell underwent a prolonged hospitalisation period before returning to Australia and receiving his discharge on medical grounds. Settling in Coogee, he gained employment by working on the advertising staff of several newspapers. Following the outbreak of the Second World War, Howell served with the Australian Eastern Command Headquarters but soon sought his discharge and enlisted with the United States Sea Transport Service. He died in 1964 at the age of 71.

== Early life ==
Howell was born in the Sydney suburb of Enfield, New South Wales, on 19 November 1893, the fourth son of English-born carpenter, Francis John Howell, and his Australian wife, Martha (née Sweeny). Howell was educated at Croydon Park and Burwood Public Schools, before receiving an apprenticeship as a bricklayer. Becoming a builder, he was employed in his native Enfield area of Sydney.

== First World War ==
On 3 June 1915, Howell enlisted in the Australian Imperial Force for service in the First World War. Allotted to the 7th Reinforcements of the 1st Battalion as a private, he embarked from Sydney for Egypt on 14 July aboard HMAT Orsova. Joining the 1st Battalion at Gallipoli on 1 November, Howell served on the peninsula until the Allied evacuation the following month. Returning to Egypt, the battalion spent several months training in the desert in preparation for service on the Western Front.

The 1st Battalion embarked for France in March 1916, and by April the unit was entrenched in the Fromelles sector. In the third week of July, Howell was wounded in the Battle of Pozières while taking part in the Somme offensive. Evacuated to a hospital in Sheffield, England, during early August, Howell attended a training school before returning to his battalion on 26 November. Appointed lance corporal on 10 December, he was promoted to corporal on 6 February 1917.

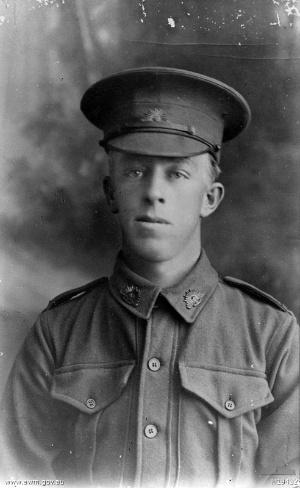
Private George J. Howell c.1915

On 9 April 1917, Howell took part in the 1st Battalion's attack on the German held village of Demicourt. During the engagement, Howell led a rifle bombing section at the forefront of his company against the German position. The section was held up several times in their advance due to heavy machine gun fire, but managed to overcome the opposition and continue the advance each time. For his actions during the battle, Howell was awarded the Military Medal, the recommendation of which cited his "... courage and devotion to duty ... was of great assistance to his company in the capture of its objectives". The notification of the award was published in a supplement to the London Gazette on 26 May 1917.

=== Victoria Cross ===
In preparation for an attack on the Hindenburg Line at Bullecourt, the 1st Australian Brigade—of which the 1st Battalion was part—was attached to the 2nd Australian Division. The attack commenced in the morning of 3 May 1917, with the 2nd Division lined up in conjunction with thirteen other divisions. Despite some progress made early in the attack, the Australian forces were soon held up by strong opposition, and in the evening the 1st Battalion was entrenched in the old German line known as 'OG1'. Three of the battalion's companies occupied the line, while a fourth was placed in reserve. Their position was such that they occupied a wedge into the German line, while two flanks were in German held territory.

From the initial attack, only the Canadians on the extreme right and the 3rd Australian Brigade on the extreme left were able to capture and hold their set objectives. Over the course of the next three days, severe fighting took place and further troops were drawn in to hold and extend the gains of 3 May. On 6 May, the Germans launched a counter-attack which forced the 3rd Brigade to withdraw from their trenches; it was during this engagement that Howell was to perform the act which was to earn him the Victoria Cross.

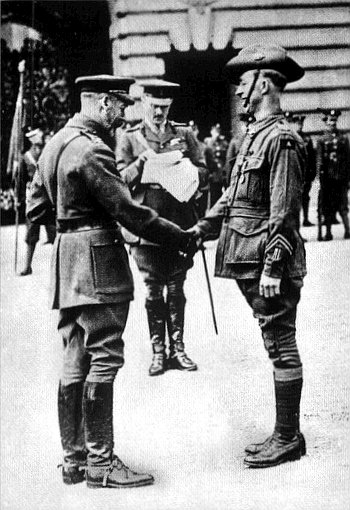
Howell (right) receives his decorations from King George V during an investiture on 21 July 1917.

At 06:00, Howell, who was in charge of a post to the right of the line, noticed the battalion on the right flank was being forced out of its trench and was beginning to retire. Immediately alerting battalion headquarters, Captain Alexander MacKenzie—who had assumed temporary command of the battalion—hurriedly organised a group of non-combatant soldiers from headquarters together with several signallers to form a defensive line along a road bank in order to fend off the expected German advance. A fierce bombing and grenade fight soon ensued, with both sides suffering heavy casualties. Fearing the Germans would outflank his battalion, Howell climbed onto the top of the parapet and began running along the trench line throwing bombs down on the Germans, all the while being subject to heavy rifle and bomb attack. Forcing the Germans back along the trench, Howell was supported by Lieutenant Thomas Richards who followed him along the trench firing bursts from his Lewis Gun. Soon exhausting his supply of bombs, Howell began to attack with his bayonet until he fell into the trench wounded. Howell had been hit in both legs by machine gun fire, and when he was brought into the clearing station some hours later, it was discovered he had suffered at least twenty-eight separate wounds. Due to his actions, the ground which had been lost was soon retaken, and the German attack was later repulsed.

The full citation for Howell's Victoria Cross appeared in a supplement to the London Gazette on 27 June 1917, reading:

War Office, 27th June, 1917.

His Majesty the KING has been graciously pleased to approve of the award of the Victoria Cross to the undermentioned Officer, Warrant Officer, Non-commissioned Officers and men:—

No. 2445 Cpl. George Julian Howell, Inf. Bn., Aus. Imp. Force.

For most conspicuous bravery. Seeing a party of the enemy were likely to outflank his Battalion, Cpl. Howell, on his own initiative, single-handed and exposed to heavy bomb and rifle fire, climbed on to the top of the parapet and proceeded to bomb the enemy, pressing them back along the trench.

Having exhausted his stock of bombs, he continued to attack the enemy with his bayonet. He was then severely wounded.

The prompt action and gallant conduct of this N C.O. in the face of superior numbers was witnessed by the whole Battalion and greatly inspired them in the subsequent successful counter attack.

=== Hospitalisation and repatriation ===
Howell's multiple wounds at Bullecourt required a prolonged hospitalisation period for treatment, and he was sent to the Norfolk and Norwich War Hospital in England. On 21 July 1917, Howell was invested with his Victoria Cross and Military Medal by King George V in the forecourt of Buckingham Palace. A photograph of the pair together was taken at this time, and later published in the Times History of the War. Promoted to sergeant, Howell returned to Australia on 31 October. Having not adequately recovered from his wounds, he was discharged from the Australian Imperial Force on 5 June 1918 on medical grounds. Howell's father and one of his brothers had also served on the Western Front during the First World War; his father with the 54th Battalion and his brother, Frederick, with the 1st Pioneer Battalion.

== Later life ==
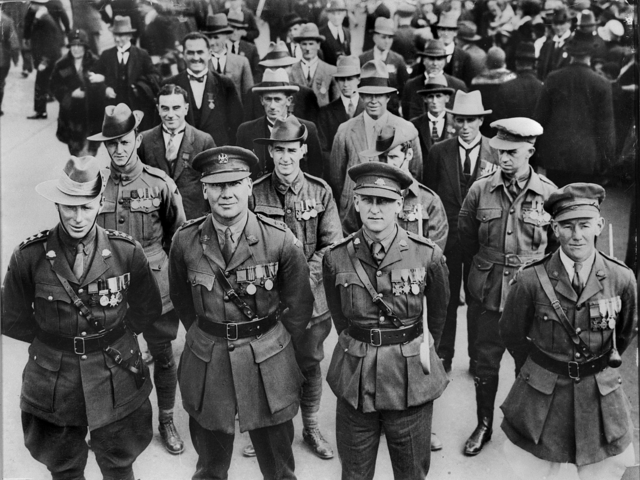
A group of Victoria Cross recipients lined up to march in the 1927 Melbourne Anzac Day march. Howell is on the right, second row.

On 1 March 1919, Howell married Sadie Lillian Yates, a nurse, at St Stephen's Presbyterian Church in Sydney. The pair settled in Coogee, where Howell was employed on the advertising staff of Smith's Newspapers Ltd and later the Bulletin Newspaper Co. Pty Ltd. By 1933, he was the New South Wales representative for the Brisbane Standard and the Queensland Worker.

At the outbreak of the Second World War, Howell once again offered his services and enlisted in the Australian Army on 14 October 1939. Posted to Eastern Command Headquarters, Paddington, he was granted the rank of staff sergeant, but found staff work to be dull and sought his discharge in February 1941. In August 1944, Howell enlisted in the United States Army for service in the United States Sea Transport Service, and was thus able to participate in the invasion of Leyte at the commencement of the Philippines campaign.

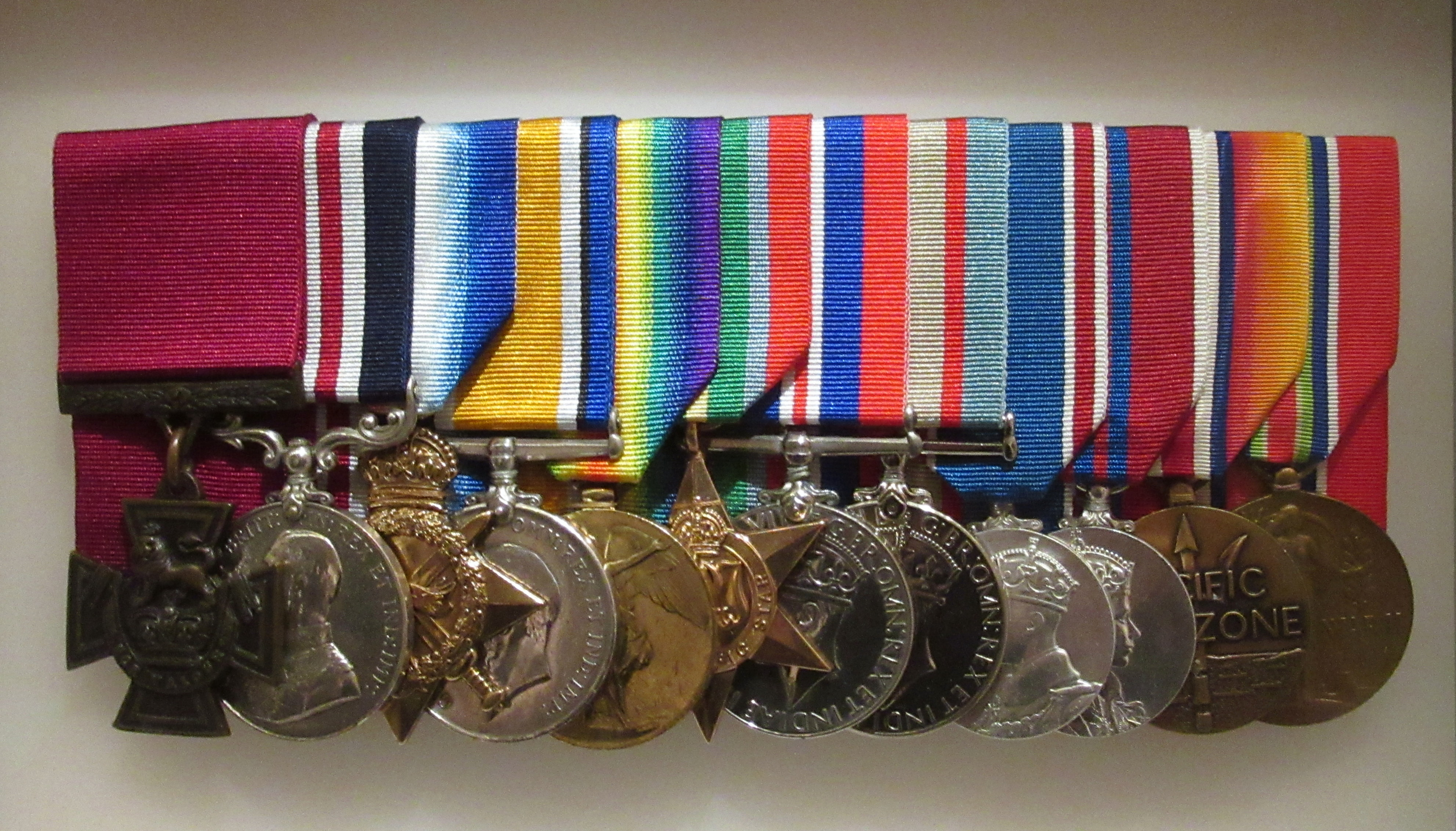
George Howell's medals at the Australian War Memorial, Canberra.

In December 1953, following his wife's death, Howell moved from Sydney to Western Australia. Accompanied by his grandson, the journey took four days by train before the pair arrived in the Perth suburb of Applecross, where Howell was to live with his married daughter, Norma. He later moved to Gunyidi, via Watheroo, where he was to reside for a few years before returning to Perth. In 1956, he joined the Australian contingent of Victoria Cross recipients who attended the parade in London's Hyde Park to commemorate the centenary of the institution of the Victoria Cross.

Howell died at the Repatriation General Hospital, Hollywood, Perth, on 23 December 1964. He was granted a funeral with military honours, before his body was cremated and his ashes interred at Karrakatta Cemetery, Perth. Howell's name is commemorated by a plaque in the Western Australian Garden of Remembrance, and his Victoria Cross and other medals are on display at the Australian War Memorial, Canberra.
