= Dominic McCarthy =

Lawrence Dominic McCarthy VC
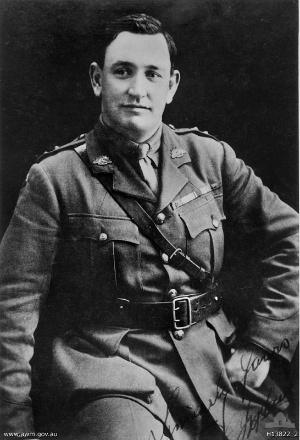
- Studio portrait of L. D. McCarthy c.1920
- Born: 21 January 1892; York, Western Australia
- Died: 25 May 1975 (aged 83); Melbourne, Victoria
- Military career
- Allegiance: Australia
- Branch: Australian Imperial Force
- Service years: 1914–20
- Rank: Lieutenant
- Nickname: Fats
- Conflicts: First World War; Gallipoli Campaign; Western Front; Battle of Pozières; Battle of Mouquet Farm; Hundred Days Offensive
- Awards: Victoria Cross; Croix de guerre (France)

Lawrence Dominic McCarthy, VC (21 January 1892 – 25 May 1975) was an Australian recipient of the Victoria Cross, the highest award for gallantry in the face of the enemy that can be awarded to British and Commonwealth forces.

== Early life ==
Lawrence Dominic McCarthy was born in York, Western Australia, on 21 January 1892. The son of Florence McCarthy of Cork, Ireland, and his wife Anne (née Sherry), he was orphaned at a young age and was brought up at St Joseph's Boys' Orphanage (later Clontarf) in Perth and educated in Catholic schools.

After completing his schooling, from the age of 13 he worked on a farm as an apprentice at Jennacubbine, near Northam. Later, he served with the 18th Light Horse, a Militia unit, for two and a half years before moving to Lion Mill, Perth. He subsequently worked as a contractor sawmiller, losing three fingers on his left hand in an accident.

== First World War ==
=== Gallipoli and the Western Front ===
McCarthy was initially rejected due to his injuries when he attempted to join the Australian Imperial Force; however, he was later accepted after proving he had won a number of shooting competitions. Enlisted on 16 October 1914 as a private, he was subsequently posted to the 16th Battalion, joining the newly formed unit at Blackboy Hill Camp. His large build later earned him the nickname "Fats". Sailing for Egypt in December, the battalion landed at Gallipoli on 26 April 1915 on the second day of the campaign against the Turkish. McCarthy remained on the peninsula until illness forced his evacuation in September. By then he had been promoted to sergeant. He returned to duty in November and was among the last in his battalion to leave Gallipoli on 20 December.

The 16th Battalion arrived in France in June 1916 where they took part in the fighting against the Germans at Pozières and Mouquet Farm in August. McCarthy was appointed company sergeant major in March 1917 and the following month was commissioned as a second lieutenant. The day after receiving his commission, McCarthy was wounded at Bullecourt and evacuated to England where he spent three months in hospital and convalescing. Rejoining his unit on 9 July, he was promoted to lieutenant on 1 November and was awarded the French Croix de guerre two days later. Between February and August 1918 he was posted the 13th Training Battalion at Tidworth, England where he trained troops, before rejoining his battalion in time for the Allied Hundred Days Offensive that began on 8 August.

=== Victoria Cross action ===
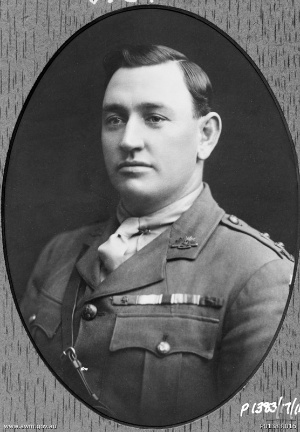
Lieutenant Lawrence Dominic McCarthy VC c.1919

On 23 August 1918, McCarthy performed what was later described in the official history as being the most effective piece of individual fighting in the history of the AIF, next to Albert Jacka's Military Cross-winning feat at Pozières. Near Madam Wood, east of Vermandovillers, France, the battalion was heavily opposed by well-posted German machine-guns. McCarthy, realizing the situation, dashed across the open ground with two men to the nearest post, where, having out-distanced his companions, he put the gun out of action, then continued fighting his way down the trench. Later, having been joined by one of his men, together they bombed their way along the trench until contact was established with an adjoining unit.

During this action McCarthy had killed 20 of the enemy, taken 50 prisoners and captured 5 machine-guns and 500 yards (460 m) of the German front. The battalion historian wrote that following McCarthy's feat, "the prisoners closed in on him from all sides ... and patted him on the back!" For this McCarthy was awarded the Victoria Cross that, within his battalion and in some quarters of the London press, came to be known as the "super-VC".

Ten days after the war ended, on 21 November 1918, McCarthy was evacuated to England with influenza, where he was subsequently informed that he had been awarded the Victoria Cross for his action. After recovering he rejoined his battalion on 7 January 1919, subsequently receiving the award from King George V at Buckingham Palace on 12 July 1919.

== Later life ==
McCarthy returned to Australia in December 1919, having married Florence Norville the previous January in London. McCarthy was demobilised in August 1920 and returned to Western Australia. Moving to Victoria in 1926 with his wife, he gained employment with the Sunshine Harvester Works as a commercial traveler and remained with them until 1934 when the company was forced to lay off staff during the Great Depression.

He subsequently found new work the following year with the Trustees, Executors & Agency Co. in Melbourne, and worked for that company until his retirement in 1969. The couple's only son, Lawrence, was killed in action fighting the Japanese on Bougainville on 20 May 1945.

== Death and legacy ==
McCarthy died at the Repatriation General Hospital, Heidelberg in Melbourne in May 1975 and was cremated with full military honours.

The Lawrence McCarthy Ward at the former Repatriation General Hospital, Hollywood has been named in his honour. His Victoria Cross is displayed at the Australian War Memorial in Canberra.

== Sources ==
- Taylor, Paige (26 April 2007). "York RSL club named after McCarthy". The Australian. Canberra. ISSN 1038-8761.
- Connell, W. H. (1986). "McCarthy, Lawrence Dominic (1892–1975)". Australian Dictionary of Biography. Vol. 10. National Centre of Biography, Australian National University. pp. 219–220. ISBN 0522843271.
- Wigmore, Lionel (1986). They Dared Mightily (2nd ed.). Canberra: Australian War Memorial. ISBN 0642994714.
