= Bill Newton =

Australian Victoria Cross recipient (1919–1943)

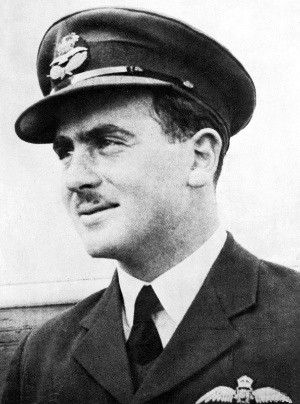
- Newton, c. 1942
- Born: 8 June 1919; St Kilda, Victoria
- Died: 29 March 1943 (aged 23); Salamaua, Territory of New Guinea
- Military career
- Allegiance: Australia
- Branch: Citizen Military Force (1938–40); Royal Australian Air Force (1940–43)
- Service years: 1938–43
- Rank: Flight Lieutenant
- Nicknames: "The Firebug"; "Blue Cap"
- Units: No. 22 Squadron (1942–43)
- Conflicts: World War II; New Guinea campaign; Battle of the Bismarck Sea (POW) (executed)
- Awards: Victoria Cross

William Ellis Newton, VC (8 June 1919 – 29 March 1943) was an Australian recipient of the Victoria Cross, the highest decoration for gallantry in the face of the enemy that can be awarded to a member of the British and Commonwealth armed forces. He was honoured for his actions as a bomber pilot in Papua New Guinea during March 1943 when, despite intense anti-aircraft fire, he pressed home a series of attacks on the Salamaua Isthmus, the last of which saw him forced to ditch his aircraft in the sea. Newton was still officially posted as missing when the award was made in October 1943. It later emerged that he had been taken captive by the Japanese, and executed by beheading on 29 March.

Raised in Melbourne, Newton excelled at sport, playing cricket at youth state level. He joined the Citizen Military Forces in 1938 and enlisted in the Royal Australian Air Force (RAAF) in February 1940. Described as having the dash of "an Errol Flynn or a Keith Miller", Newton served as a flying instructor in Australia before being posted to No. 22 Squadron, which began operating Boston light bombers in New Guinea late in 1942. Having just taken part in the Battle of the Bismarck Sea, he was on his fifty-second mission when he was shot down and captured. Newton was the only Australian airman to receive a Victoria Cross for action in the South West Pacific theatre of World War II, and the sole Australian to be so decorated while flying with an RAAF squadron.

== Family, education and sport ==
Born in the Melbourne suburb of St Kilda on 8 June 1919, Bill Newton was the youngest child of dentist Charles Ellis Newton and his second wife Minnie. His three older half-siblings from Charles' earlier marriage included two brothers, John and Lindsay, and a sister, Phyllis. Bill entered Melbourne Grammar School in 1929, but two years later switched to the nearby St Kilda Park Central School as the family income was reduced through the impact of the Great Depression. In 1934, aged fifteen, he was able to return to Melbourne Grammar where, despite struggling with his schoolwork, he completed his Intermediate certificate. He gave up further study when his father died suddenly of a heart attack at the age of fifty-one, and began working in a silk warehouse.

Considered while at school to be a future leader in the community, Newton was also a talented all-round sportsman, playing cricket, Australian rules football, golf and water polo. A fast bowler in cricket, he was friends with Keith Miller, and collected the Victorian Cricket Association (VCA) Colts bowling trophy for 1937–38; Miller collected the equivalent batting prize. In January 1938, Newton dismissed Test batsman Bill Ponsford—still the only Australian to have twice scored 400 in a first-class innings—for four in a Colts game at the Melbourne Cricket Ground. The following year, he gained selection in the Victorian Second XI. He opened the bowling against the New South Wales Second XI—his first and only match—taking a total of 3/113 including the wickets of Ron Saggers and Arthur Morris who, like Miller, went on to become members of the Invincibles.

== Early career ==
Newton had been a sergeant in his cadet corps at school, and joined the Citizens Military Force on 28 November 1938, serving as a private in the machine-gun section of the 6th Battalion, Royal Melbourne Regiment. Still employed in the silk warehouse when World War II broke out in September 1939, he resigned to join the Royal Australian Air Force (RAAF) on 5 February 1940. He had earlier attempted to enlist when he turned eighteen in 1937, but his mother refused to give her permission; with Australia now at war, she consented. His brothers—dentists by profession, like their father—also enlisted in the armed forces, John as a surgeon lieutenant in the Royal Australian Navy and Lindsay as a captain in the Army Medical Corps.

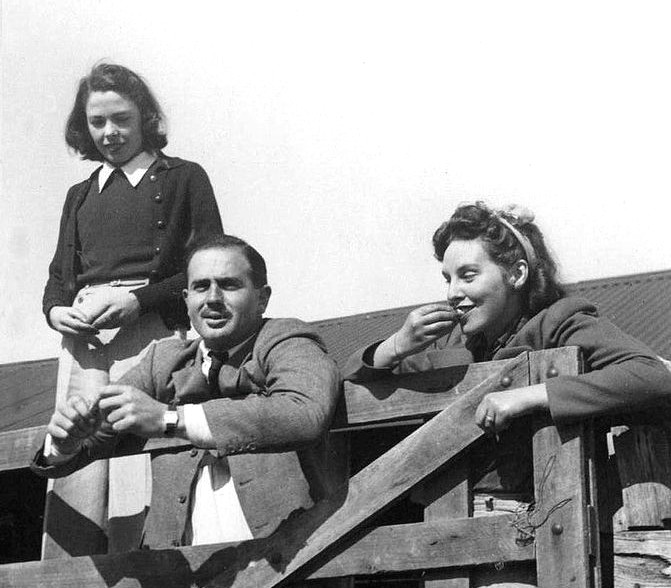
Newton relaxing at Wagga in 1941

Newton undertook basic training with No. 1 Elementary Flying Training School in Parafield, South Australia, flying De Havilland Tiger Moths, and with No. 21 (City of Melbourne) Squadron at RAAF Station Laverton, Victoria, flying CAC Wirraways. He was awarded his wings and commissioned as a pilot officer on 28 June 1940. Following advanced training on Avro Ansons with No. 1 Service Flying Training School at RAAF Point Cook in September, he was selected to become a flight instructor. He completed the requisite course at Central Flying School in Camden, New South Wales, and was promoted to flying officer on 28 December. He subsequently began training students under the Empire Air Training Scheme at No. 2 Service Flying Training School near Wagga Wagga, under the command of Group Captain Frederick Scherger.

In October 1941, Newton transferred to No. 5 Service Flying Training School at Uranquinty. He found instruction frustrating, as he longed for a combat assignment. His fortunes changed in February 1942, when he was selected for the navigation course on Ansons at the General Reconnaissance School based at Laverton. From there he was sent to No. 1 Operational Training Unit at Sale, Victoria, for conversion to Lockheed Hudson twin-engined light bombers during March and April.

Promoted to flight lieutenant on 1 April 1942, Newton was posted the following month to No. 22 (City of Sydney) Squadron, based at RAAF Station Richmond, New South Wales. Previously equipped with Hudsons, the unit had just begun converting to the more advanced Douglas Boston when Newton arrived. A comrade described him as a "big brash, likeable man who could drink most of us under the table, was a good pilot, good at sports, and had a way with girls". No. 22 Squadron was engaged in convoy escort and anti-submarine patrols off Sydney from July to September, before moving north to Townsville, Queensland. In November, it was deployed to Port Moresby in Papua New Guinea, under the control of No. 9 Operational Group RAAF.

== New Guinea campaign ==
Newton undertook the first of his fifty-two operational sorties on 1 January 1943, under the leadership of his commanding officer, Squadron Leader Keith Hampshire. During February, Newton flew low-level missions through monsoon conditions and hazardous mountain terrain, attacking Japanese forces ranged against Allied troops in the Morobe province. In early March, he took part in the Battle of the Bismarck Sea, one of the key engagements in the South West Pacific theatre, bombing and strafing Lae airfield to prevent its force of enemy fighters taking off to intercept Allied aircraft attacking the Japanese fleet. Newton gained a reputation for driving straight at his targets without evasive manoeuvre, and always leaving them in flames; this earned him the nickname "The Firebug". The Japanese gunners reportedly knew him as "Blue Cap", from his habit of wearing an old blue cricket cap on operations. In spite of the hazards of the air war in New Guinea, he was quoted as saying, "The troops on the ground should get two medals each, before any airman gets one".

=== Attacks on Salamaua ===
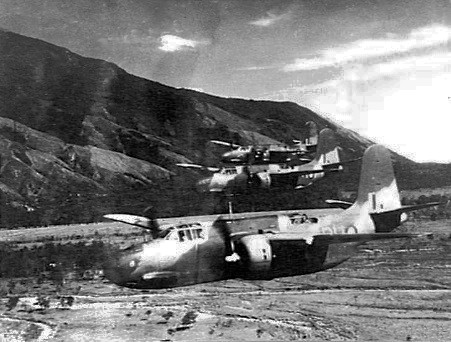
Bostons of No. 22 Squadron over New Guinea, c. 1942–43

On 16 March 1943, Newton led a sortie on the Salamaua Isthmus in which his Boston was hit repeatedly by Japanese anti-aircraft fire, suffering damage to its fuselage, wings, fuel tanks, and undercarriage. He continued his attack and dropped his bombs at low level on buildings, ammunition dumps and fuel stores, returning for a second pass at the target to strafe it with machine-gun fire. Newton managed to get his crippled machine back to base, where it was found to be marked with ninety-eight bullet holes. Two days later, he and his two-man crew made a further attack on Salamaua with five other Bostons. As he bombed his designated target, Newton's plane was seen to burst into flames, having been raked by cannon fire from the ground. Attempting to keep his aircraft aloft as long as possible to get his crew away from enemy lines, he was able to ditch in the sea approximately 1,000 yards (910 m) offshore.

The Boston's navigator, Sergeant Basil Eastwood, was killed in the forced landing but Newton and his wireless operator, Flight Sergeant John Lyon, survived and managed to swim ashore. Several of the other aircraft in the flight circled the area; one returned to base straight away to inform Hampshire, and the remainder were later forced to depart through lack of fuel. Newton and Lyon originally made their way inland with the help of natives, aiming to contact an Australian Coastwatcher, but subsequently returned to the coast. There they were captured by a Japanese patrol of No. 5 Special Naval Landing Force. The two airmen were taken to Salamaua and interrogated until 20 March, before being moved to Lae, where Lyon was bayoneted to death on the orders of Rear Admiral Ruitaro Fujita, the senior Japanese commander in the area. Newton was taken back to Salamaua where, on 29 March 1943, he was ceremonially beheaded with a samurai sword by Sub-Lieutenant Uichi Komai, the naval officer who had captured him. Komai was killed in the Philippines soon afterwards, and Fujita committed suicide at the end of the war.

=== Revelations and reactions ===
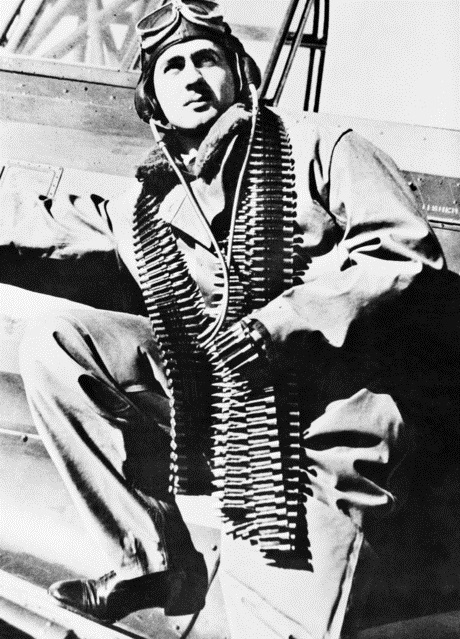
Newton c. 1942–43

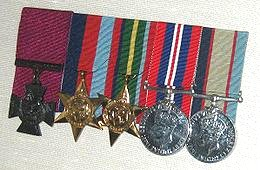
Newton's medals at the Australian War Memorial

It was initially believed that Newton had failed to escape from the Boston after it ditched into the sea, and he was posted as missing. Hampshire had immediately dispatched a sortie to recover the pair that were last seen swimming for shore, but no sign of them was found. Two weeks later, he wrote a letter to Newton's mother in which he described her son's courage and expressed the hope that he might yet be found alive. Hampshire concluded, "Bill is one of those rare fellows I shall miss for a long time, and if it is to be, remember for an age". The details of his capture and execution were only revealed later that year in a diary found on a Japanese soldier. Newton was not specifically named, but he was identified by circumstantial evidence: the diary entry recorded the beheading of an Australian flight lieutenant who had been shot down by anti-aircraft fire on 18 March 1943 while flying a Douglas aircraft. The Japanese observer described the prisoner as "composed" in the face of his impending execution, and "unshaken to the last". After the decapitation, a seaman slashed open the dead man's stomach, declaring, "Something for the other day. Take that."

General Headquarters South West Pacific Area released details of the execution on 5 October, but initially refused to name Newton due to the lack of absolute certainty as to identification. Air Vice Marshal Bill Bostock, Air Officer Commanding RAAF Command, contended that naming him would change the impact of the news upon Newton's fellow No. 22 Squadron members "from the impersonal to the closely personal" and hence "seriously affect morale". News of the atrocity provoked shock in Australia. In an attempt to alleviate anxiety among the families of other missing airmen, the Federal government announced on 12 October that the relatives of the slain man had been informed of his death.

=== Victoria Cross ===
Newton was awarded the Victoria Cross for his actions on 16–18 March, becoming the only Australian airman to earn the decoration in the South West Pacific theatre of World War II, and the only one while flying with an RAAF squadron. The citation, which incorrectly implied that he was shot down on 17 March rather than the following day, and as having failed to escape from his sinking aircraft, was promulgated in The London Gazette on 19 October 1943:

Air Ministry, 19th October, 1943.

The KING has been graciously pleased, on the advice of Australian Ministers, to confer the VICTORIA CROSS on the undermentioned officer in recognition of most conspicuous bravery: —

Flight Lieutenant William Ellis NEWTON (Aus. 748), Royal Australian Air Force, No. 22 (R.A.A.F.) Squadron (missing).

Flight Lieutenant Newton served with No. 22 Squadron, Royal Australian Air Force, in New Guinea from May, 1942, to March, 1943, and completed 52 operational sorties.

Throughout, he displayed great courage and an iron determination to inflict the utmost damage on the enemy. His splendid offensive flying and fighting were attended with brilliant success. Disdaining evasive tactics when under the heaviest fire, he always went straight to his objectives. He carried out many daring machine-gun attacks on enemy positions involving low-flying over long distances in the face of continuous fire at point-blank range.

On three occasions, he dived through intense anti-aircraft fire to release his bombs on important targets on the Salamaua Isthmus. On one of these occasions, his starboard engine failed over the target, but he succeeded in flying back to an airfield 160 miles away. When leading an attack on an objective on 16 March 1943, he dived through intense and accurate shell fire and his aircraft was hit repeatedly. Nevertheless, he held to his course and bombed his target from a low level. The attack resulted in the destruction of many buildings and dumps, including two 40,000-gallon fuel installations. Although his aircraft was crippled, with fuselage and wing sections torn, petrol tanks pierced, main-planes and engines seriously damaged, and one of the main tyres flat, Flight Lieutenant Newton managed to fly it back to base and make a successful landing.

Despite this harassing experience, he returned next day to the same locality. His target, this time a single building, was even more difficult but he again attacked with his usual courage and resolution, flying a steady course through a barrage of fire. He scored a hit on the building but at the same moment his aircraft burst into flames.

Flight Lieutenant Newton maintained control and calmly turned his aircraft away and flew along the shore. He saw it as his duty to keep the aircraft in the air as long as he could so as to take his crew as far away as possible from the enemy's positions. With great skill, he brought his blazing aircraft down on the water. Two members of the crew were able to extricate themselves and were seen swimming to the shore, but the gallant pilot is missing. According to other air crews who witnessed the occurrence, his escape-hatch was not opened and his dinghy was not inflated. Without regard to his own safety, he had done all that man could do to prevent his crew from falling into enemy hands.

Flight Lieutenant Newton's many examples of conspicuous bravery have rarely been equalled and will serve as a shining inspiration to all who follow him.

== Legacy ==
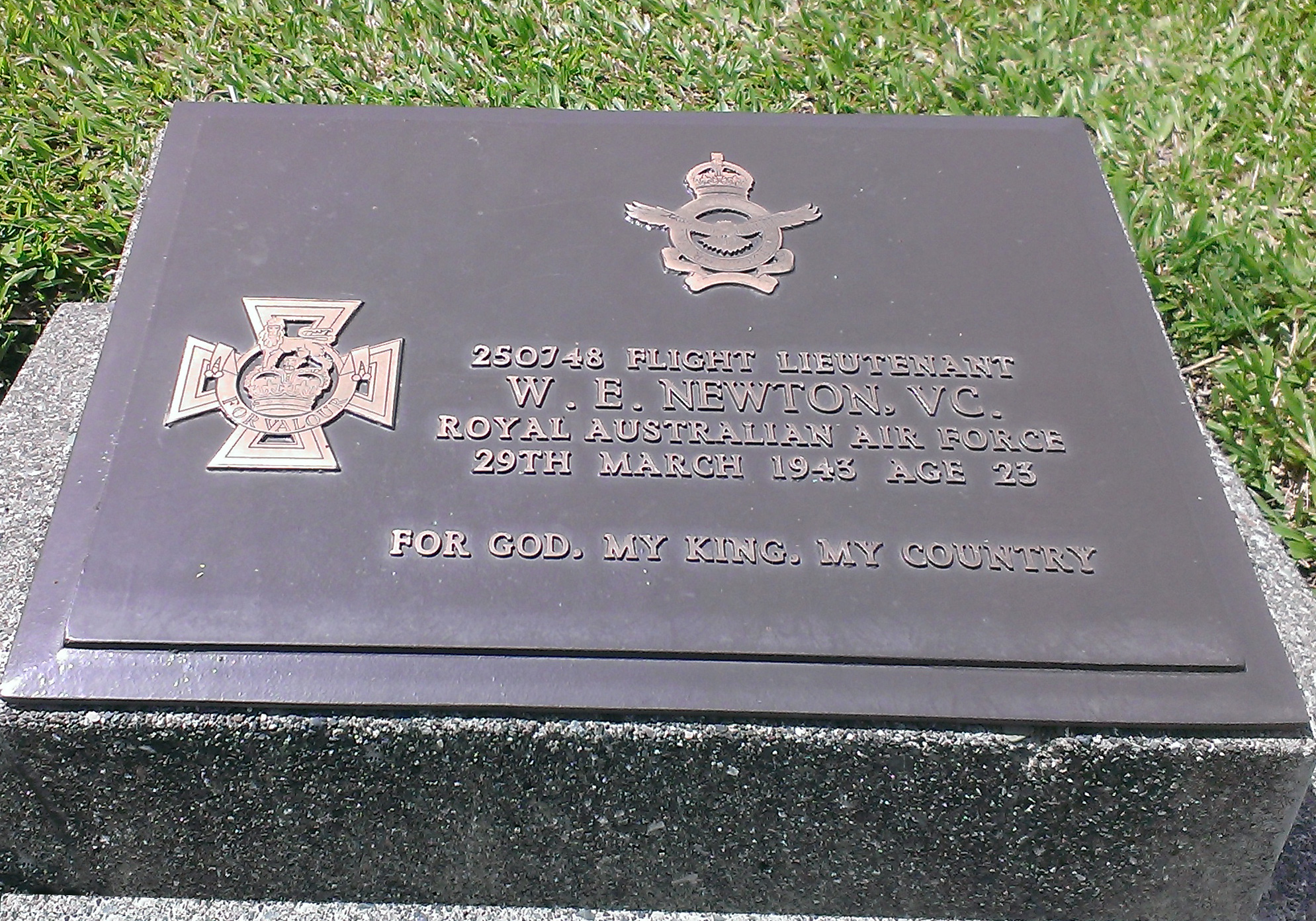
Newton's grave marker at Lae War Cemetery

Buried initially in an unmarked bomb crater in Salamaua, Newton's body was recovered and re-interred in Lae War Cemetery after Salamaua's capture by Allied troops in September 1943. His grave marker bears the epitaph For God, my king, my country. In early 1944, the recently constructed No. 4 Airfield in Nadzab was renamed Newton Field in his honour. For many years, the story of Newton's death was intertwined with that of an Australian commando, Sergeant Len Siffleet, who had also been captured in New Guinea. A photograph showing Siffleet about to be beheaded was discovered by American troops in April 1944 and was thought to have depicted Newton in Salamaua, but there is no known photograph of the airman's execution.

Newton's mother Minnie was presented with her son's Victoria Cross by the Governor-General, the Duke of Gloucester, on 30 November 1945. She donated it to the Australian War Memorial, Canberra, where it remains on display with his other medals. Newton is also commemorated on Canberra's Remembrance Driveway. In the 1990s, his friend Keith Miller successfully fought to ensure that the Victoria Racing Club abandoned a plan to rename the William Ellis Newton Steeplechase—run on Anzac Day—after a commercial sponsor. Later in the decade, Miller also publicly questioned Australia Post's exclusion of Newton from a series of stamps featuring notable Australians such as cricketer Sir Donald Bradman. A plaque dedicated to No. 22 Squadron was unveiled at the Australian War Memorial by the Chief of Air Force, Air Marshal Angus Houston, on 16 March 2003, the sixtieth anniversary of Newton's attack on Salamaua.
