= Frederick Bell =

Recipient of the Victoria Cross

Frederick William Bell VC
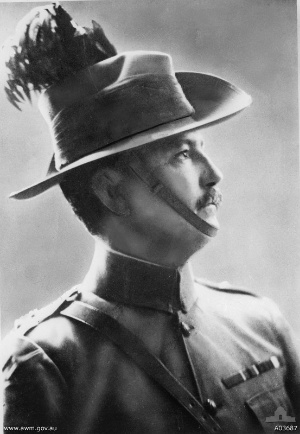
- Born: 3 April 1875; Perth, Western Australia
- Died: 28 April 1954 (aged 79); Bristol, England
- Burial place: Canford Cemetery, Bristol, England
- Military career
- Allegiance: Australia; United Kingdom
- Branch: Australian Military Forces; British Army
- Service years: 1899–1902; 1907–1918
- Rank: Lieutenant Colonel
- Conflicts: Second Boer War: Battle of Diamond Hill; First World War: Western Front
- Awards: Victoria Cross; Mentioned in Despatches (2)

Frederick William Bell, VC (3 April 1875 – 28 April 1954) was an Australian recipient of the Victoria Cross, the highest award for gallantry in the face of the enemy that can be awarded to British and Commonwealth forces.

== Early life and career ==
Bell was born on 3 April 1875 in Perth, Western Australia, and was the first person born in Western Australia to receive the Victoria Cross.

He was 26 years old, and a lieutenant in the West Australian Mounted Infantry during the Second Boer War when the following deed took place for which he was awarded the VC.

On 16 May 1901 at Brakpan, Transvaal, South Africa, when retiring through a heavy fire after holding the right flank, Lieutenant Bell noticed a man dismounted and returned and took him up behind him. The horse not being equal to the weight fell with them, Lieutenant Bell then remained behind and covered the man's retirement till he was out of danger.

Following the end of the war, he went to the United Kingdom and received the decoration from the Prince of Wales during a large coronation parade of colonial troops in London on 1 July 1902.

Bell died on 28 April 1954, and was buried in Canford Cemetery, Bristol, England.

The Frederick Bell ward at the former Repatriation General Hospital, Hollywood was named in his honour.

== Medals ==
The Western Australian Government bought Bell's medals in 1984 from a stepson living in Canada, and the set was placed in the collection of the Western Australian Museum. In July 2016 the medals went on loan to the Australian War Memorial in Canberra, where they were on display until June 2019.
