= Thomas Axford =

Australian recipient of the Victoria Cross (1894–1983)

Thomas Leslie Axford VC MM
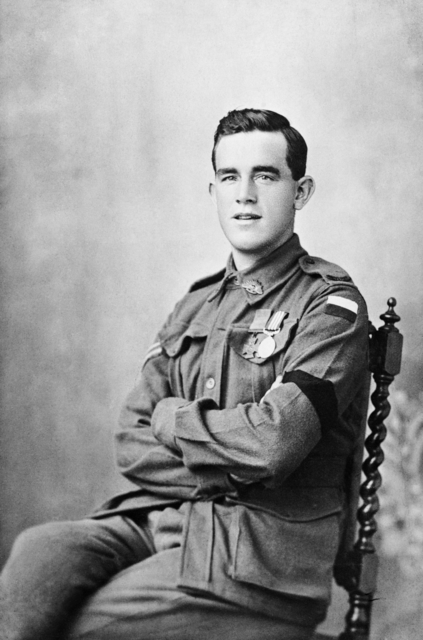
- Jack Axford c.1918
- Born: 18 June 1894; Carrieton, South Australia
- Died: 11 October 1983 (aged 89); Between Dubai and Hong Kong (aircraft)
- Burial place: Karrakatta Cemetery, Western Australia
- Military career
- Allegiance: Australia
- Branch: Australian Army
- Service years: 1912–1919; 1941–1947
- Rank: Sergeant
- Nickname: Jack
- Units: 16th Battalion
- Conflicts: First World War; Western Front; Battle of the Somme; Battle of Pozieres; Battle of Mouquet Farm; Battle of Passchendaele (WIA); German spring offensive; Battle of Hamel; Second World War
- Awards: Victoria Cross; Military Medal

Thomas Leslie "Jack" Axford, VC, MM (18 June 1894 – 11 October 1983) was an Australian recipient of the Victoria Cross, the highest award for gallantry in the face of the enemy awarded to British and Commonwealth forces.

== Early life ==
Thomas Axford was born on 18 June 1894 at Carrieton in South Australia. His father was an auctioneer, originally from Tasmania. When Axford was two years old, the family moved to Western Australia, settling in Coolgardie. Educated at Coolgardie Primary School, he worked at the Boulder City Brewery after completing his schooling. In 1912, he enlisted in the 84th Infantry (Goldfields Regiment) of the Citizen Military Forces.

== First World War ==
In July 1915, at the age of 21, Axford joined the Australian Imperial Force (AIF) for service in the First World War. He was assigned to the 11th Reinforcements of the 16th Battalion on 9 August 1915, which left Australia on HMAT Benalla that November. He arrived in the Middle East to join his unit in March 1916, missing the just completed Gallipoli Campaign.

In June 1916, Axford's battalion went to France to fight on the Western Front. During the Battle of Mouquet Farm on 11 August 1916, Axford was evacuated with shellshock. He returned to the battalion after two days. During most of 1917, the battalion was engaged in fighting in Belgium, attacking the Hindenburg Line. During the Third Battle of Ypres, in fighting at Gapaard Farm, Axford was badly wounded in the knee by shrapnel. After medical treatment in England he rejoined the battalion in January 1918. The following month, he was promoted to lance corporal. During the German spring offensive, from March to April 1918, 16th Battalion was heavily engaged in fighting around Hébuterne. In May he was awarded the Military Medal (MM).

It was during the Battle of Hamel, on 4 July 1918, that the events that led to Axford being awarded the Victoria Cross (VC) took place. His platoon was attacking towards Vaire Wood when a neighbouring platoon came under heavy fire. Axford took prompt action to remedy the situation. The citation for his VC read:

On 4 July 1918 during the attack at Vaire and Hamel Woods, France, when the advance of the adjoining platoon was being delayed in uncut wire and machine-gun fire, and his company commander had become a casualty, Lance-Corporal Axford charged and threw bombs amongst the enemy gun crews. He then jumped into the trench, and charging with his bayonet, killed 10 of the enemy and took six prisoners. He threw the machine-guns over the parapet and the delayed platoon was able to advance. He then rejoined his own platoon and fought with it during the remainder of the operations.

In addition to being awarded the VC, Axford was promoted to corporal several days after the battle. Shortly before the end of the war, Axford returned to Australia on furlough. He was discharged from the AIF on 2 February 1919.

== Later life ==
Axford returned to his old job at the Boulder Brewery, then went to learn a trade at Kalgoorlie Foundry, but was not eligible under the Australian Soldiers' Repatriation Act. He undertook various laboring jobs in the Eastern Goldfields. Later on he worked for a sewing machine company, and did casual work wherever he could get it until the early 1930s, when he worked initially as a commissionaire, then as a records clerk with the Western Australian Department of Mines in Perth.

He had married Lily Maud Foster, a shop assistant, at St Mary's Cathedral, Perth, on 27 November 1926. They lived in the Perth suburb of Mount Hawthorn and were to have five children.

In June 1941, during the Second World War, he left his position at the Department of Mines to serve in the army's Western Australian Echelon and Records Office, in Perth, part of Headquarters Western Command. He was discharged with the rank of sergeant in April 1947, and returned to his position as a records clerk at the Department of Mines.

He died on 11 October 1983 while aboard a flight returning to Australia following a Victoria Cross and George Cross Association reunion. Survived by his five children, he was cremated at the Karrakatta Crematorium in Perth. His wife predeceased him earlier in 1983.

== Legacy ==
Axford's war medals, including his Victoria Cross, were donated to the Australian War Memorial in Canberra, where they are on display. Axford Park in Mount Hawthorn, and the Thomas Axford ward at the former Repatriation General Hospital, Hollywood, are named in his honour. On Anzac Day 2018, Axford and fellow VC recipient John Carroll, were honoured with a paver on the Walk of Fame in Kalgoorlie, Western Australia.
