= John Carroll (soldier) =

Australian recipient of the Victoria Cross

John Carroll VC
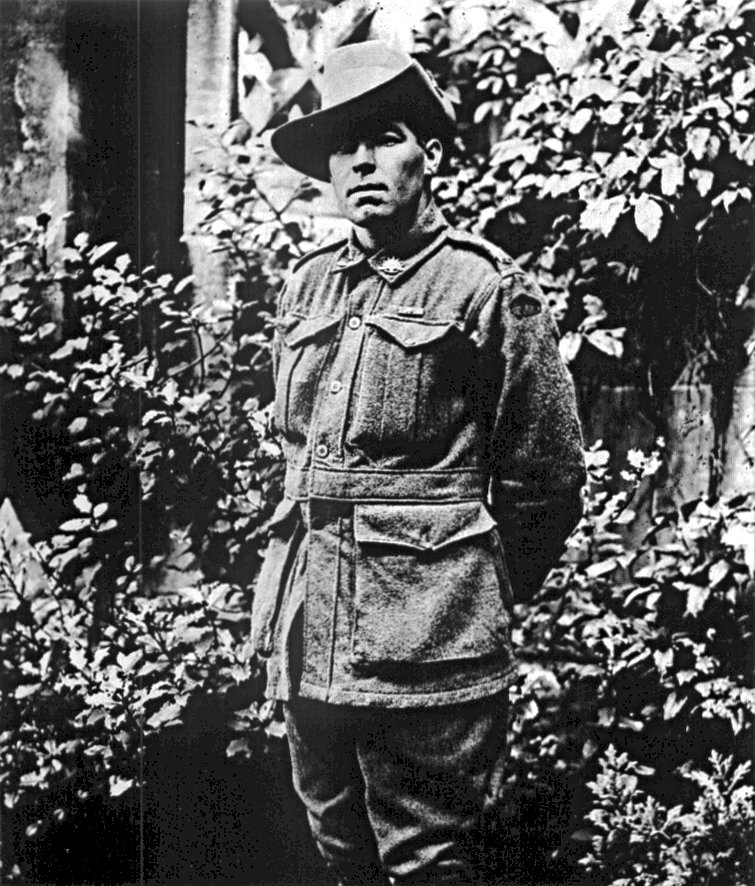
- John Carroll VC, in London, August 1918, shortly before returning to Australia.
- Born: 16 August 1891; Brisbane, Queensland
- Died: 4 October 1971 (aged 80); Perth, Western Australia
- Military career
- Allegiance: Australia
- Branch: Australian Imperial Force
- Service years: 1916–18
- Rank: Private
- Conflicts: First World War; Western Front; Battle of Messines; Battle of Passchendaele (WIA)
- Awards: Victoria Cross; British War Medal; Victory Medal

John Carroll, VC (16 August 1891 – 4 October 1971) was an Australian recipient of the Victoria Cross, the highest award for gallantry in the face of the enemy awarded to British and Commonwealth forces. He was also known as Jack Carroll.

== Early life ==
Born in Brisbane, Queensland to Irish parents, Carroll moved to Western Australia while still a child. He worked as a labourer and railway guard before enlisting in the Australian Imperial Force as a private in April 1916.

== Military career ==
Joining the Australian 3rd Division, Carroll was originally a reinforcement for the Western Australian 44th Battalion before moving to the New South Wales 33rd Battalion in November 1916.

On 7–12 June 1917 at St. Yves, Belgium, during the Battle of Messines, Private Carroll rushed the enemy's trench and bayoneted four of the occupants. He then noticed a comrade in difficulty and went to his assistance, killing another of the enemy. Next, he single-handedly attacked a machine-gun team, killing three of them and capturing the gun. Later, two of his comrades were buried by a shell; in spite of heavy shelling and machine-gun fire, he managed to rescue them.

Carroll was later severely wounded at Passchendaele in October 1917. His rehabilitation was successful but after briefly returning to his unit, the Australian Prime Minister Billy Hughes, then in England, arranged for furlough to Australia for Victoria Cross recipients to help recruiting in Australia.

It has been claimed that Carroll failed on three occasions to appear at Buckingham Palace for his Victoria Cross award ceremony and when he did turn up on the fourth occasion he took advantage of one of the entitlements of VC recipients to call out the Palace Guard. These stories first appeared in the Perth Daily News on 2 November 1927, and the source of the story would seem to be Carroll himself. He related the story while he was in hospital after an industrial accident in which one of his feet was amputated. Just out of surgery and presumably still in pain, he was interviewed by a reporter who does not seem to have checked the veracity of the stories.

In addition to the Victoria Cross, Carroll was awarded the British War Medal and the Victory Medal.

== Later life ==
Carroll died on 4 October 1971, at the age of 80, and is buried in Karrakatta Cemetery, Perth, Western Australia. His Victoria Cross is displayed at the Australian War Memorial in Canberra.

== Legacy ==
The John Carroll ward at the former Repatriation General Hospital, Hollywood is named in his honour. In addition, a street in the suburb of Hughes in Canberra, the capital of Australia, is named after Private Carroll (the suburb being named after Prime Minister Billy Hughes). On Anzac Day 2018, Carroll and fellow VC recipient Thomas Axford, were honoured with a paver on the Walk of Fame in Kalgoorlie, Western Australia.
