= Clifford Sadlier =

Australian recipient of the Victoria Cross

Clifford William King Sadlier VC
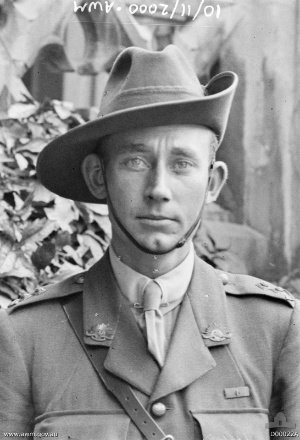
- Lieutenant Clifford Sadlier in 1918
- Born: 1892; Camberwell, Victoria
- Died: 28 April 1964 (aged 71–72); Busselton, Western Australia
- Military career
- Allegiance: Australia
- Branch: Australian Imperial Force
- Service years: 1915–19
- Rank: Lieutenant
- Nickname: Bill
- Units: 51st Battalion
- Conflicts: First World War; Western Front; Second Battle of Villers-Bretonneux
- Awards: Victoria Cross

Clifford William King Sadlier, VC (1892 – 28 April 1964) was an Australian recipient of the Victoria Cross, the highest award for gallantry in the face of the enemy that can be awarded to British and Commonwealth forces.

== Early life ==
Born in the Melbourne suburb of Camberwell, Sadlier attended University High School before his family moved to Western Australia while he was still a youth. They settled at Subiaco, Western Australia from where Sadlier, then employed as a commercial traveller, enlisted on 26 May 1915.

== First World War ==
Sadlier first embarked on board HT Nestor, posted to the Australian Army Medical Corps and allotted as a reinforcement to 1st Australian General Hospital, with which he served at Heliopolis. In February 1916 he returned to Australia on nursing duty, and on 9 November he re-embarked, aboard HMAT Argyllshire then as a reinforcement to 51st Battalion.

The 51st Battalion, Australian Imperial Force was raised at Tel-el-Kebir, Egypt, on 1 March 1916 from half of the 11th Battalion (veterans of the Gallipoli landings) and reinforcements of the 11th and 28th Battalions, all personnel being Western Australian volunteers. Sadlier joined the unit in France on 13 May 1917, was promoted to corporal a few days later and on 14 July 1917 was gazetted to a first appointment as a second lieutenant. Promotion to lieutenant came on 1 April 1918.

=== Victoria Cross ===
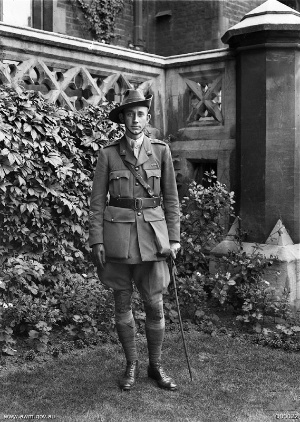
Convalescing in England 1918

He was 26 years old, and a lieutenant in the 51st Battalion, Australian Imperial Force during the First World War when the following deed took place during the Second Battle of Villers-Bretonneux for which he was awarded the VC.

War Office, 11th July, 1918.

His Majesty the KING has been graciously pleased to approve of the award of the Victoria Cross to the undermentioned Officers and Non-Commissioned Officer: —

[...]

On 24/25 April 1918 at Villers-Bretonneux, France, Lieutenant Sadlier's platoon had to advance through a wood where a strong enemy machine-gun post was causing casualties and preventing the advance. Although he was himself wounded, Lieutenant Sadlier at once collected his bombing section and led them against the machine-guns, killing the crews and capturing two of the guns. By this time his party were all casualties and alone he attacked a third enemy machine-gun with his revolver, killing the crew and taking the gun. In doing so, he was again wounded.The very gallant conduct of this officer was the means of clearing the flank, and allowing the battalion to move forward, thereby saving a most critical situation. His coolness and utter disregard of danger inspired all.

== Later life ==
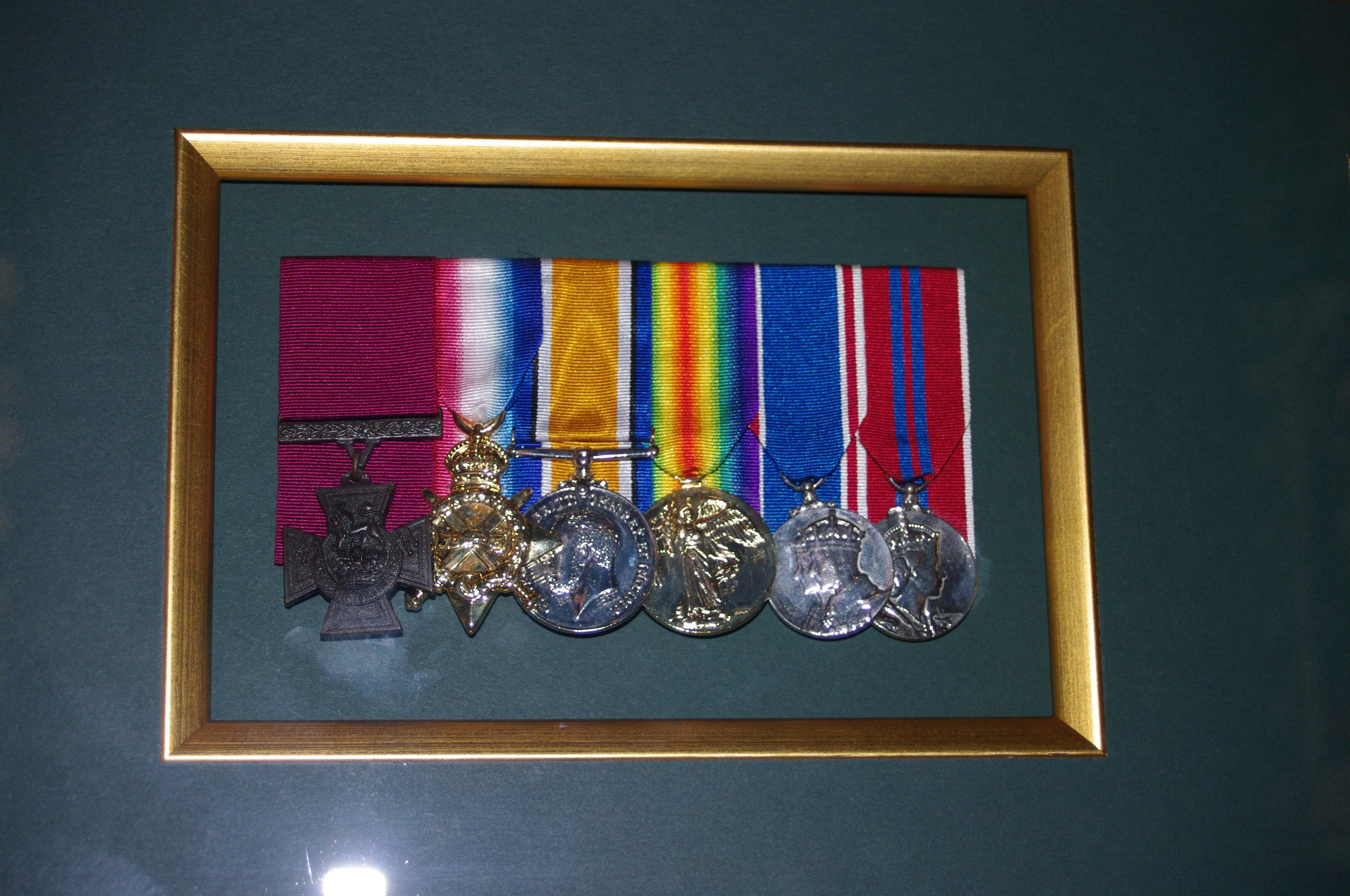
Sadlier's medals on display in St Georges Cathedral, Perth

Sadlier was invalided to Australia on 24 August 1918 and was discharged on 4 March 1919. He returned to Western Australia living at Busselton and for some years was State Secretary of the Returned and Services League of Australia.

From 1926 to 1929, Sadlier was on the Claremont Road Board (City of Nedlands), including as chairman in 1928 and 1929.

He married Alice Edith Smart on 17 July 1936. From then until 1949 he was a clerk in the Repatriation Department in Perth. He went to London in 1956 for the Victoria Cross Centenary celebrations.

He died in Busselton on 28 April 1964 and was cremated at Karrakatta Cemetery, Perth. His ashes were taken from there by the funeral director. In 1980, his widow donated his medals to St. George's Cathedral, and they are held in a safe there, with replicas on display in the Soldiers' Chapel. The Clifford Sadlier Ward at the former Repatriation General Hospital, Hollywood is named in his honour, and Cliff Sadlier VC Memorial Park in Daglish, Western Australia, near Subiaco, is named in his honour.
