= Richard Kelliher =

Recipient of the Victoria Cross

Richard Kelliher VC
- Richard Kelliher in 1946
- Born: 1 September 1910; Ballybeggan, Ireland
- Died: 28 January 1963 (aged 52); Melbourne, Australia
- Military career
- Allegiance: Australia
- Branch: Second Australian Imperial Force
- Service years: 1941–1946
- Rank: Private
- Units: 2/25th Battalion
- Conflicts: Second World War; Syria-Lebanon campaign; New Guinea campaign
- Awards: Victoria Cross

Richard Kelliher, VC (1 September 1910 – 28 January 1963) was an Irish-born Australian recipient of the Victoria Cross, the highest award for gallantry that can be awarded to British and Commonwealth forces. Kelliher received his VC while serving with the Second Australian Imperial Force in New Guinea during the Second World War.

== Early life ==
Kelliher was born in Ballybeggan, Tralee, County Kerry in Ireland, then part of the United Kingdom of Great Britain and Ireland, and emigrated to Queensland, Australia in 1929 with his sister Norah. Due to lack of work during the Great Depression his sister moved to Sydney while Kelliher became a swagman, working a variety of jobs.

== Military service ==
Kelliher enlisted in the Second Australian Imperial Force on 21 February 1941, and was sent to the Middle East. He was assigned to the 2/25th Battalion, which was on garrison duty in Syria. The battalion returned to Australia in March 1942 and was sent to New Guinea, where it took part in the Battle of Buna–Gona later that year. During this battle Kelliher was arrested after allegedly running from the front. He was later court martialled for cowardice in the face of the enemy where he claimed his platoon commander had sent him back for information. The commander had been killed in the battle and Kelliher had no witnesses to his version. He was convicted, but the charge was soon after quashed and, after rejoining his unit, Kelliher stated he would prove he was no coward.

On 13 September 1943, during the Battle of Lae, the platoon to which Private Kelliher was attached came under very heavy fire from a concealed Japanese machine gun, at Heath's Plantation. The machine gun inflicted severe casualties and prevented the platoon's advance. Private Kelliher suddenly, on his own initiative, dashed towards the post and hurled two grenades at it, which killed some of the enemy. He returned to his section, seized a Bren gun, dashed back to the enemy post and silenced it. He then asked permission to go out again to rescue his wounded section leader, which he accomplished successfully under heavy fire from another enemy position.

Kelliher had bad health after suffering from both typhoid and meningitis before the war. In 1944 he was declared medically unfit for active service and discharged.

== Later life ==
He later travelled to London to take part in the London Victory Parade of 1946. He married in 1949 and had three children. While working as a cleaner at Brisbane City Hall he applied for, but failed to get, a taxi driver's licence and the family moved to Melbourne where he got a job as a gardener.

By the late 1950s Kelliher was completely disabled due to ill health and on 16 January 1963 had a stroke. He died in Heidelberg Repatriation Hospital on 28 January. In 1966, Kelliher's battalion association bought his VC for AU$2,000 (equivalent to AU$27,400 in 2021) and donated it to the Australian War Memorial, where it is on display.

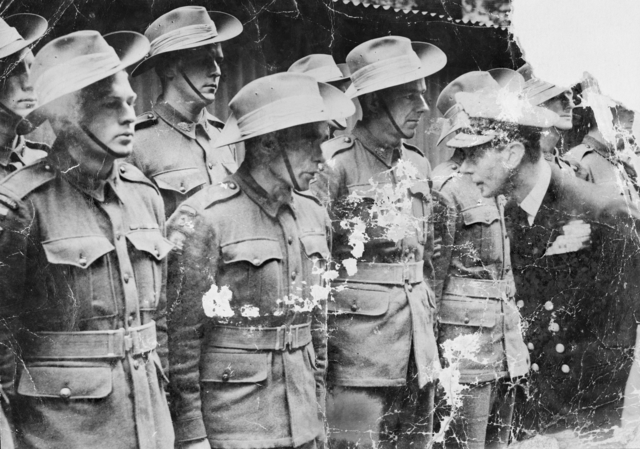
Kelliher (centre) meets George VI at Victory Parade June 1946
