= Stan Gurney =

Australian recipient of the Victoria Cross (1908–1942)

Stan Gurney VC
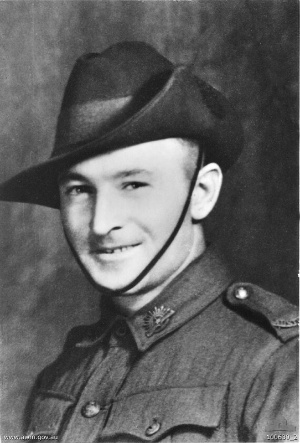
- Born: Arthur Stanley Gurney; 15 December 1908; Day Dawn, Western Australia
- Died: 22 July 1942 (aged 33); El Alamein, Egypt
- Burial place: El Alamein War Cemetery
- Military career
- Allegiance: Australia
- Branch: Second Australian Imperial Force
- Service years: 1940–1942
- Rank: Private
- Units: 2/48th Battalion
- Conflicts: Second World War; Western Desert Campaign; Siege of Tobruk; First Battle of El Alamein †
- Awards: Victoria Cross

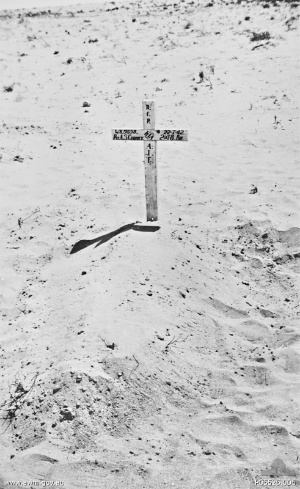
The desert grave of WX9858 Private (Pte) Arthur Stanley Gurney

Gurney's grave at El Alamein

Arthur Stanley Gurney, VC (15 December 1908 – 22 July 1942) was an Australian recipient of the Victoria Cross, the highest award for gallantry in the face of the enemy that can be awarded to British and Commonwealth forces.

== Military career ==
Gurney was 33 years old, and a private in the 2/48th Battalion (South Australia), Second Australian Imperial Force during the Second World War when he was awarded the VC (posthumously) for the following deed.

On 22 July 1942 at Tel-el-Eisa, Egypt, during the First Battle of El Alamein, intense machine-gun fire held up the company to which Private Gurney belonged and inflicted heavy casualties on it, including killing or wounding all the officers. Private Gurney, realizing the seriousness of the situation, charged the nearest machine-gun post, silencing the guns and bayoneting three of the crew. He bayoneted two more at a second post before a grenade knocked him down. Picking himself up, he charged a third post and disappeared from view. Later, his comrades, whose advance he had made possible, found his body.

=== VC citation ===
Gurney's VC citation appeared in the London Gazette of 8 September 1942, reading:

No.WX.9858 Private Arthur Stanley Gurney, Australian Military Forces. For gallant and unselfish bravery in silencing enemy machine-gun posts by bayonet assault at Tell El Eisa on 22 July 1942, thus allowing his Company to continue the advance.

During an attack on strong German positions in the early morning of 22 July 1942, the Company to which Private Gurney belonged was held up by intense machine-gun fire from posts less than 100 yards ahead, heavy casualties being inflicted on our troops, all the officers being killed or wounded.

Grasping the seriousness of the situation and without hesitation, Private Gurney charged the nearest enemy machine-gun post, bayoneted three men and silenced the post. He then continued on to a second post, bayoneted two men and sent out a third as a prisoner. At his stage a stick grenade was thrown at Private Gurney which knocked him to the ground. He rose again, picked up his rifle and charged a third post using the bayonet with great vigour. He then disappeared from view, and later his body was found in an enemy post.

By this single-handed act of gallantry in the face of a determined enemy, Private Gurney enabled his Company to press forward to its objective, inflicting heavy losses upon the enemy. The successful outcome of this engagement was almost entirely due to Private Gurney's heroism at the moment when it was needed.

== Legacy ==
The Stan Gurney ward at the former Repatriation General Hospital, Hollywood, and the Stan Gurney V.C. Memorial Bike Race, held annually in Western Australia, are named in his honour.

== Medals ==
Gurney's medal group, including his Victoria Cross, came into the National Collection in 1994, and is on permanent display at the Australian War Memorial.

Ribbon	Description	Notes
Ribbon for the VC	Victoria Cross (VC)	gazetted 1942
Ribbon for the 1939–45 Star	1939-45 Star	
Ribbon for the Africa Star	Africa Star	
Ribbon for the Defence Medal	Defence Medal	
Ribbon for the War Medal 39–45	War Medal 1939-45	
Ribbon for the ASM 39–45	Australia Service Medal 1939-45	
