= Hughie Edwards =

Australian airman, Victoria Cross recipient, and state governor

Air Commodore Sir Hughie Edwards VC KCMG CB DSO OBE DFC
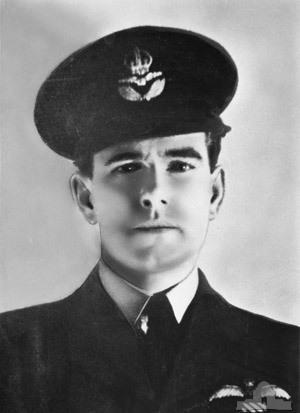

23rd Governor of Western Australia
- In office 7 January 1974 – 2 April 1975
- Monarch: Elizabeth II
- Premier: John Tonkin; Sir Charles Court
- Preceded by: Sir Douglas Kendrew
- Succeeded by: Sir Wallace Kyle

Personal details
- Born: 1 August 1914 Fremantle, Western Australia
- Died: 5 August 1982 (aged 68) Sydney, New South Wales

Military service
- Allegiance: Australia (1934–1936); United Kingdom (1936–1963)
- Branch/service: Australian Army (1934–1935); Royal Australian Air Force (1935–1936); Royal Air Force (1936–1963)
- Years of service: 1934–1963
- Rank: Air Commodore
- Commands: RAF Habbaniya; RAF Wattisham; RAF Kuala Lumpur; RAF Binbrook; No. 105 Squadron
- Battles/wars: Second World War; European theatre; Battle of the Atlantic; Mediterranean theatre; Siege of Malta; South-East Asian theatre; Suez Crisis
- Awards: Victoria Cross; Knight Commander of the Order of St Michael and St George; Companion of the Order of the Bath; Distinguished Service Order; Officer of the Order of the British Empire; Distinguished Flying Cross; Knight of the Order of St John; Mention in Despatches

Air Commodore Sir Hughie Idwal Edwards, VC, KCMG, CB, DSO, OBE, DFC (1 August 1914 – 5 August 1982) was a senior officer in the Royal Air Force, Governor of Western Australia, and an Australian recipient of the Victoria Cross, the highest decoration for gallantry "in the face of the enemy" that can be awarded to members of the British and Commonwealth armed forces. Serving as a bomber pilot in the Royal Air Force (RAF), Edwards was decorated with the Victoria Cross in 1941 for his efforts in leading a bombing raid against the port of Bremen, one of the most heavily defended towns in Germany. He became the most highly decorated Australian serviceman of the Second World War.

Born in Fremantle, Western Australia, Edwards joined the Royal Australian Air Force in 1935, and a year later was granted a short service commission with the RAF. Serving throughout the Second World War, he gained a permanent commission and continued his career in the RAF after the war; he retired in 1963 with the rank of air commodore. Returning to Australia, he was appointed Governor of Western Australia in 1974.

== Early life ==
Edwards was born in Fremantle, Western Australia, on 1 August 1914, the third of five children to Welsh parents Hugh, a blacksmith and farrier, and his wife Jane (née Watkins), who had emigrated to Australia in 1909. Named after his father, he was always referred to by his middle name of Idwal in his family. Edwards received his initial education at White Gum Valley School, before attending the Fremantle Boys' School where he achieved well academically, although he later claimed this was due to a good memory rather than high intelligence. However, Edwards was reluctantly forced to leave school at the age of fourteen as the family finances could no longer support him. Described as a "shy, under-confident, introspective and imaginative lad" at this stage in his life, he gained employment as a shipping office clerk.

With the onset of the Great Depression, Edwards found himself unemployed, before gaining a job with a horse racing stable in Fremantle. His position entailed him taking the horses to the beach each morning for a swim, grooming them, and attending the twice weekly race meetings; a lifelong interest in horse racing consequently emerged at this time. After later working for a brief period in a factory, he enlisted in the Australian Army in March 1934 and was posted to the 6th Heavy Battery, Royal Australian Artillery, with the rank of private. During this period, Edwards was an active sportsman, excelling in Australian rules football—where he played six matches with leading Western Australian Football League (WAFL) club South Fremantle—and cricket with the Fremantle garrison team.

== Early Air Force career ==
In 1935, he was selected for flying training with the Royal Australian Air Force at RAAF Point Cook, after which he transferred to the RAF, being granted a short service commission as a pilot officer on 21 August 1936. Posted to No. 15 Bomber Squadron, he was appointed adjutant of No. 90 Squadron in March 1937, flying Bristol Blenheim bombers. He received a promotion to flying officer on 21 May 1938.

In August 1938, Edwards was piloting a Blenheim near the Scottish border when he flew into a storm at 2,300 metres (7,500 ft). When the ailerons froze, the aircraft was forced down to 1,600 metres (5,200 ft) and Edwards ordered the navigator and rear gunner to bail out of the aircraft. Down to 230 metres (750 ft), he made an effort to jump clear, but his parachute became entangled with the bomber's radio mast pylon. In the ensuing crash, he sustained head injuries and a badly broken leg, which was only saved after extensive surgery, which left that leg shorter than the other. After the accident, he was declared unfit for flying duties until April 1940, when he was posted to No. 139 Squadron for active service due to the outbreak of war. He was promoted to flight lieutenant on 21 May 1940.

== Second World War ==
In May 1941, Edwards became commanding officer of No. 105 Squadron replacing the previous incumbent, who had been killed in an anti-shipping raid on Stavanger. At that time, the Squadron was engaged in a series of daylight operations against Germany and the occupied countries, with its principal targets being enemy shipping, power installations, shipbuilding yards, locomotives, steelworks and marshalling yards. On 15 June, by now an acting wing commander, Edwards led six Blenheims on a search for enemy shipping and soon sighted a convoy of eight merchantmen anchored near The Hague. He launched an attack at low level, his bombs striking a 4,000-ton ship. He was subsequently awarded the Distinguished Flying Cross for this action.

On 4 July 1941, Edwards led a daylight attack ("Operation Wreckage") against the port of Bremen, one of the most heavily defended towns in Germany. Edwards' force of twelve Blenheims attacked at a height of about 50 feet through telephone wires and high voltage power lines. The bombers successfully penetrated fierce anti-aircraft fire and a dense balloon barrage, but further fire over the port itself resulted in the loss of four of the attacking force. Edwards brought his remaining aircraft safely back, although all had been hit and his own Blenheim (serial V6028) had been hit over 20 times. His actions in the raid earned him the Victoria Cross.

The full citation for Edwards' Victoria Cross appeared in the London Gazette on 22 July 1941, it read:

Air Ministry, 22nd July, 1941.

ROYAL AIR FORCE

The KING has been graciously pleased to confer the Victoria Cross on the undermentioned officer in recognition of most conspicuous bravery:—

Acting Wing Commander Hughie Idwal Edwards, D.F.C. (39005), No 105. Squadron.

Wing Commander Edwards, although handicapped by a physical disability resulting from a flying accident, has repeatedly displayed gallantry of the highest order in pressing home bombing attacks from very low heights against strongly defended objectives.

On 4th July, 1941, he led an important attack on the Port of Bremen, one of the most heavily defended towns in Germany. This attack had to be made in daylight and there were no clouds to afford concealment. During the approach to the German coast several enemy ships were sighted and Wing Commander Edwards knew that his aircraft would be reported and that the defences would be in a state of readiness. Undaunted by this misfortune he brought his formation 50 miles overland to the target, flying at a height of little more than 50 feet, passing under high-tension cables, carrying away telegraph wires and finally passing through a formidable balloon barrage. On reaching Bremen he was met with a hail of fire, all his aircraft being hit and four of them being destroyed. Nevertheless he made a most successful attack, and then with the greatest skill and coolness withdrew the surviving aircraft without further loss.

Throughout the execution of this operation which he had planned personally with full knowledge of the risks entailed, Wing Commander Edwards displayed the highest possible standard of gallantry and determination.

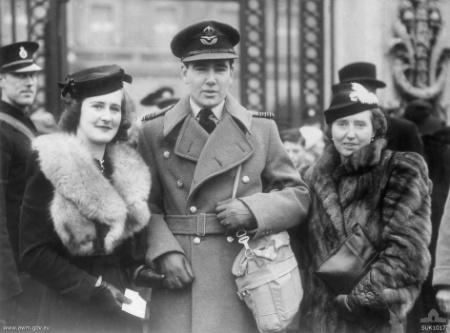
Edwards with his wife, left, and mother-in-law, right, leaving Buckingham Palace after attending an investiture ceremony.

In July 1941, Edwards took the Squadron to Malta, in order to conduct operations against Axis shipping carrying reinforcements from Italy to Tripoli and Benghazi. The unit remained in the area until October, when they returned to Britain. Participating in a goodwill mission to the United States, he was appointed chief flying instructor at Wellesbourne Mountford, (Number 22 Operational Training Unit) in January 1942, before re-assuming command of No. 105 Squadron on 3 August. During this time, Edwards married Cherry Kyrle "Pat" Beresford; the pair were later to have a son, Anthony, and a daughter, Sarah. He was promoted to temporary wing commander on 1 September.

On 6 December 1942, Edwards participated in a daylight bombing raid on the Philips Factory at Eindhoven, The Netherlands. Despite heavy opposition, the bombers successfully damaged or destroyed many of their targets, with two gun posts being silenced. Several members of the raid were decorated, including Edwards, who was awarded the Distinguished Service Order; becoming the first airman to receive the Victoria Cross, Distinguished Service Order and Distinguished Flying Cross in the Second World War. Promoted to acting group captain, he assumed command of the bomber station at Binbrook in February 1943, where, despite his senior position, he continued to participate in operations. On 18 August, he was promoted to war substantive wing commander.

With the end of the European campaigns in sight, Edwards was transferred to the Pacific theatre, first to Ceylon as group captain, Bomber Operations. In January 1945, he was mentioned in despatches, and appointed the senior administrative staff officer at Headquarters, South East Asia Command; serving in this position until the conclusion of the war.

== Later career ==
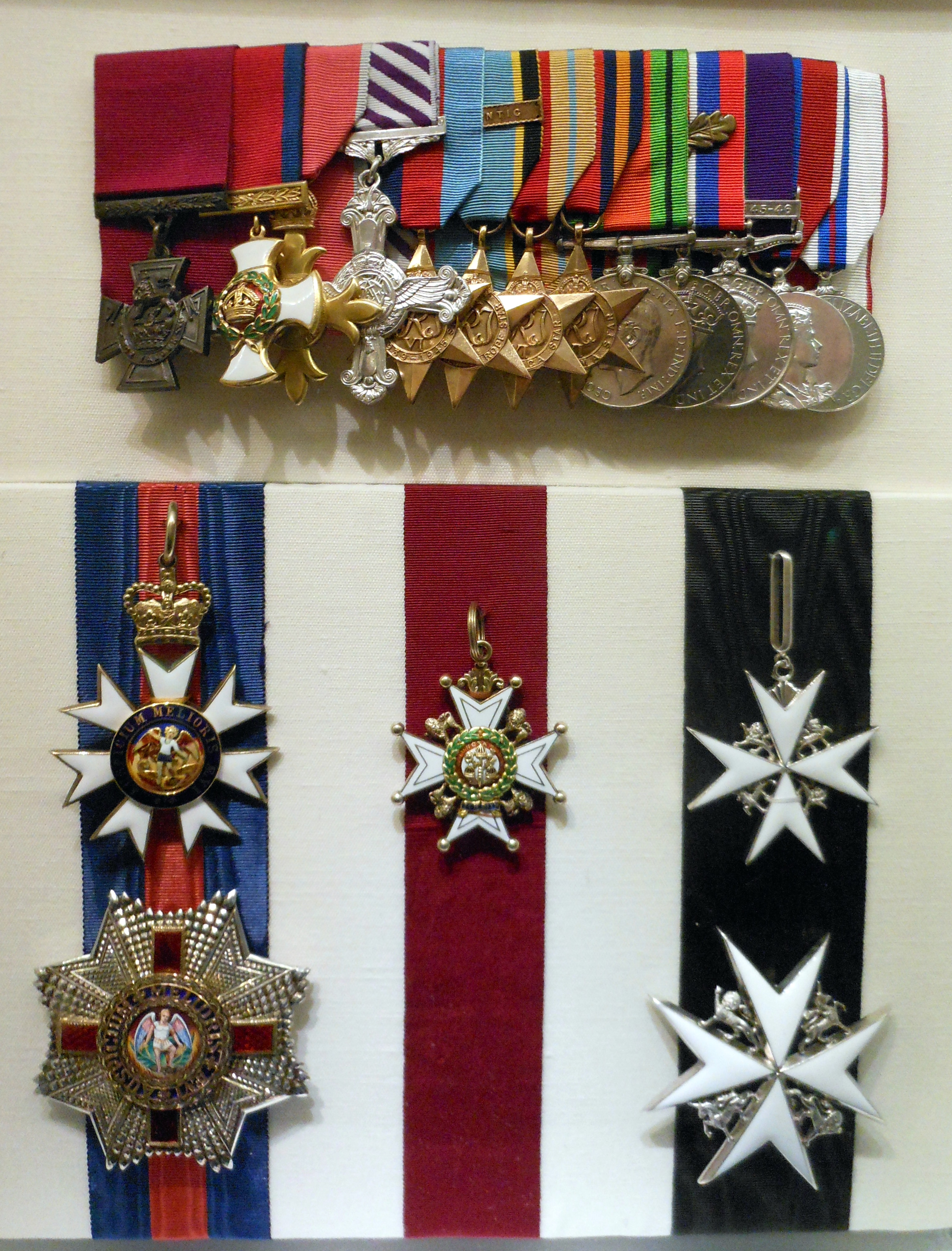
Edwards' medal group at the Australian War Memorial, Canberra.

Edwards continued his career in the post-war RAF, and was granted the substantive rank of squadron leader from 1 September 1945. Posted as a staff officer at Air Headquarters, Malaya, from November 1945 until February 1946, he served with the Netherlands East Indies Forces for a short period before returning to Malaya as air adviser to the general officer commanding. In September 1945, he was posted as station commander at the RAF Base in Kuala Lumpur; he remained there until May 1947, and was awarded an Officer of the Order of the British Empire (OBE) for his services in south-east Asia.

Returning to Britain in June 1947, he undertook a six-month course at the Staff College, before receiving a two-year posting as senior personnel staff officer of No. 21 Group, Flying Training Command. Promoted to wing commander on 1 July 1947, his next posting was as the senior instructor on the leadership course at Digby, Lincolnshire. Subsequently, he was appointed station commander at Wattisham, Suffolk. He was promoted to group captain on 1 January 1954. Edwards was the station commander of the RAF base RAF Habbaniya in Iraq during the Suez Crisis of 1956, and also the critical time of the Iraqi Revolution of 14 July 1958. He returned to Britain on 21 October 1958 to command the Central Fighter Establishment, West Raynham, with the acting rank of air commodore.

Awarded a Companion of the Order of the Bath in the 1959 New Year Honours, he was promoted to the substantive rank of air commodore on 1 July 1959, and appointed as an aide-de-camp to Queen Elizabeth II in March 1960. His final appointment with the RAF was as Director of Establishments at the Air Ministry, London, from January 1962 until his retirement on 30 September 1963.

== Later life and governorship ==
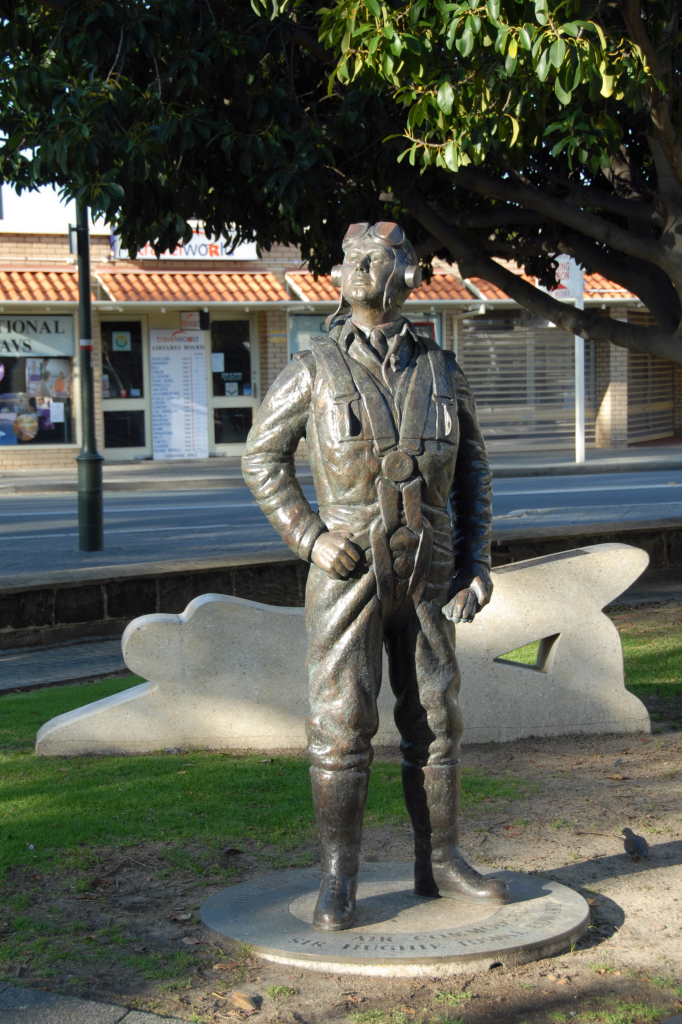
Statue of Edwards in Fremantle, Western Australia.

Returning to Australia, Edwards became the Australian Representative for Selection Trust. In 1966 his wife, Cherry, died; he married Dorothy Carew Berrick in 1972. The pair were said to complement each other well, as Dorothy limped on her left leg after being knocked over by a car on a crosswalk in Sydney in 1970, while Edwards limped with his right after his flying accident in 1938. In 1974, Edwards relinquished his position as the Australian Representative for Selection Trust and was appointed Governor of Western Australia. He was sworn in on 7 January 1974, and appointed a Knight Commander of the Order of St Michael and St George (KCMG) the following October.

His knighthood involved some controversy, following his wife's public comment that he was the only Australian state governor without such an honour. As knighthoods were then conferred by the Queen on the recommendation of her Federal and State governments, and the governor was the Queen's representative in the state, this was seen as highly inappropriate, especially given the Western Australian Labor State government of the day, led by John Tonkin had a policy of not recommending Imperial Honours. However, the Tonkin Government was defeated in April 1974 and the incoming Liberal Premier, Sir Charles Court, was happy to make the necessary recommendation.

While Governor, Edwards' first official role was to christen Alan Bond's America's Cup challenger, Southern Cross. One of the couple's first visitors to the Governor's estate was a man by the name of Thomas Dunhill, who had consumed ten beers and wanted to see the house. Lady Edwards apparently found him in the pantry; he was arrested by the police but no charges were laid. Ill health forced Edwards to resign his vice-regal appointment on 2 April 1975, and he and Lady Edwards went to live in Sydney, where he continued in semi-retirement with commercial interests.

On 5 August 1982, while on his way to attend a Test match at the Sydney Cricket Ground, Edwards unexpectedly collapsed and died; his ashes were buried in the Karrakatta Cemetery, Perth, after a State Funeral and cremation at Northern Suburbs Crematorium in Sydney. His Victoria Cross is on display at the Australian War Memorial, Canberra, and on 26 November 2002 a life-size bronze statue depicting Edwards was unveiled by then Governor of Western Australia, John Sanderson, in Kings Square, Fremantle. The Hugh Edwards Ward at Hollywood Private Hospital has been named in his honour.

== Notes ==
Government offices
Preceded by Major General Sir Douglas Kendrew	Governor of Western Australia; 1974–1975	Succeeded by Air Chief Marshal Sir Wallace Kyle
