= Martin O'Meara =

Martin O'Meara VC
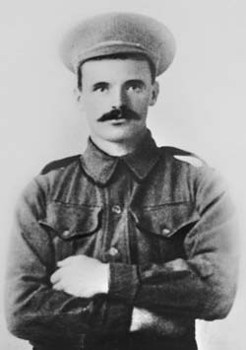
- Private Martin O'Meara c. 1915–16
- Born: 6 November 1885; Terryglass, Lorrha, Ireland
- Died: 20 December 1935 (aged 50); Perth, Western Australia
- Burial place: Karrakatta Cemetery, Perth
- Military career
- Allegiance: Australia
- Branch: Australian Imperial Force
- Service years: 1915–1919
- Rank: Sergeant
- Units: 16th Battalion
- Conflicts: First World War; Battle of Pozières
- Awards: Victoria Cross

Martin O'Meara, VC (6 November 1885 – 20 December 1935) was an Irish-born Australian recipient of the Victoria Cross, the highest award for gallantry in the face of the enemy that can be awarded to British and Commonwealth forces.

== Early life ==
O'Meara was born at Lorrha, County Tipperary. He spent his early years in County Tipperary and by 1911 had moved to County Kilkenny where he was working as a wood cutter.

He arrived in South Australia in 1912, where he initially worked as a labourer at Wild Horse Plains. He then travelled to Port Augusta where he worked as a labourer on railway construction projects, and then to the McLaren Vale area south of Adelaide where he was, again, a railway construction worker.

He travelled to Western Australia in 1914 and worked as a labourer in the Pinjarra area before making his way to the Collie area.

He was working as a timber cutter near Collie before enlisting in the Australian Imperial Force on 19 August 1915.

== First World War ==
Assigned to 16th Battalion as a private, O'Meara sailed from Fremantle on the troopship Ajana on 22 December 1915. He arrived at Port Suez in Egypt on 13 January 1916. He initially served with the 16th Battalion in Egypt as an infantryman and as a machine gunner with the 4th Machine Gun Company before arriving in France on 7 June 1916.

In late June 1916 he joined the 16th Battalion's newly formed Scouting Section in northern France and served as a scout, observer and sniper during his time on the Western Front in Belgium and France.

Between 9 and 12 August 1916 at Mouquet Farm, Pozières, during four days of very heavy fighting, Private O'Meara repeatedly went out and brought in wounded officers and men from "no man's land" under intense artillery and machine-gun fire. He also volunteered and carried up ammunition and bombs through a heavy barrage to a portion of the trenches which was being heavily shelled at the time.

O'Meara was wounded three times during the war: near Mouquet farm in August 1916, near Bullecourt in April 1917 and near Messines in August 1917.

He was presented with his Victoria Cross medal by King George V at Buckingham Palace on 21 July 1917.

In mid-1918 he was selected to join a group of Australian Victoria Cross recipients to return to Australia to assist with recruiting. He was promoted to Sergeant in late August 1918 and left England on 17 September 1918 on the troopship Arawa, arriving at Fremantle in Western Australia on 6 November 1918. On 7 November 1918 the Arawa's passengers were quarantined at Woodman's Point south of Perth because of a suspected influenza outbreak.

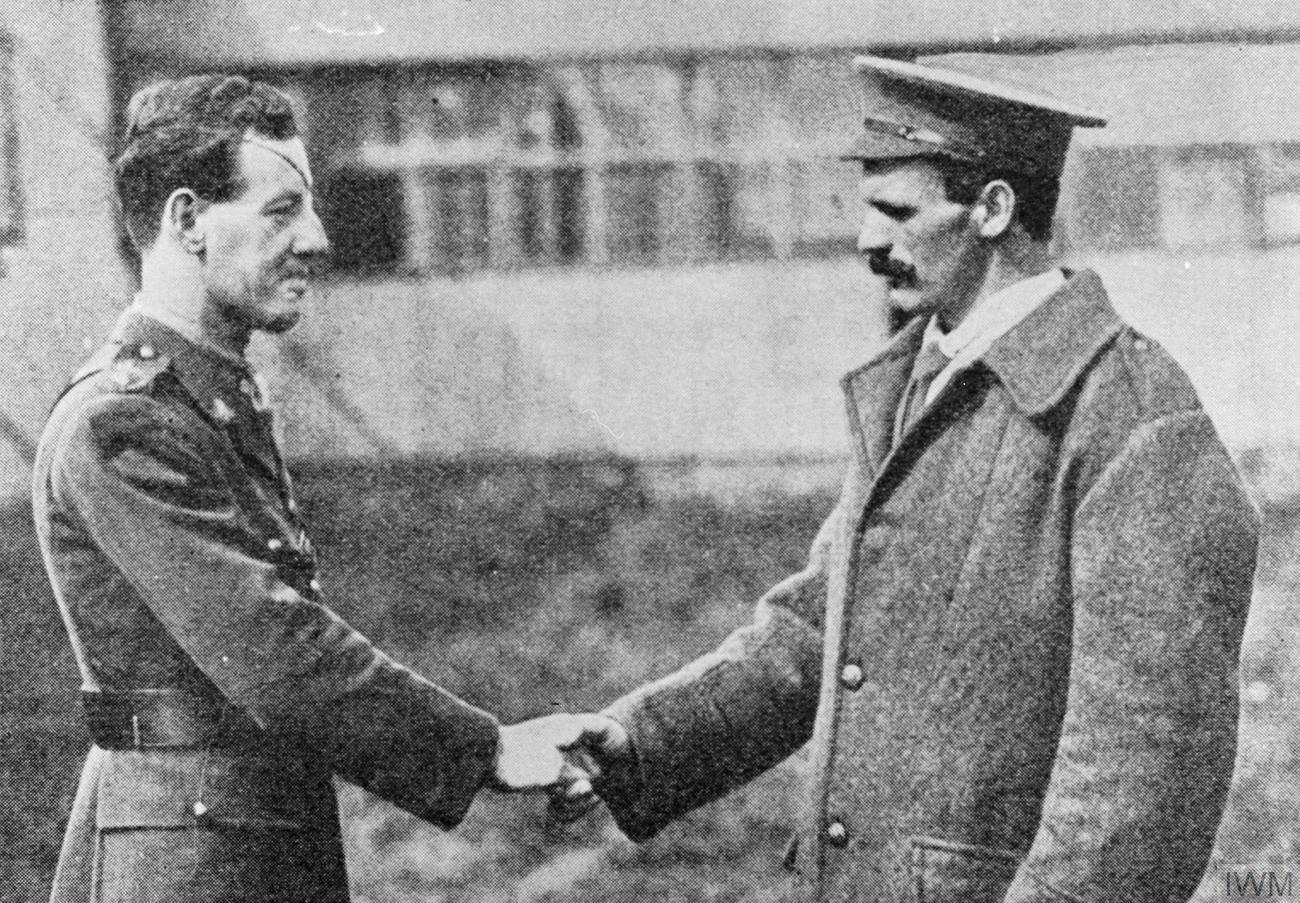
O'Meara (right) meeting fellow VC recipient, Lt. Albert Jacka, following the fighting at Pozières

== Later life ==
O'Meara had a mental breakdown in November 1918 at the Woodman's Point Quarantine Station south of Perth, shortly after arriving in Western Australia. On 13 November 1918 he was transported to the 24th Australian Auxiliary Hospital, Stromness, where he was diagnosed on 19 December 1918 as:

suffering from Delusional Insanity, with hallucinations of hearing and sight, is extremely homicidal and suicidal, and requires to be kept in restraint. He is not hopeful of his recovery in the near future. Admitted to Claremont Mental Hospital (insane patient), 3 January 1919.

O'Meara was transferred to the Claremont Hospital for the Insane on 3 January 1919, and to the newly constructed Lemnos Soldier's Hospital on 20 September 1926. He remained at Lemnos until returning to the Claremont hospital shortly before his death in December 1935 at the age of 50 years. His body was buried in Karrakatta Cemetery, Perth, Western Australia.

== The medal ==
O'Meara's Victoria Cross is held in the collections of the Army Museum of Western Australia in Fremantle. In July 2019 it was loaned by the Australian government to the National Museum of Ireland, where it will be on public display for twelve months. The loan required an amendment to the Protection of Moveable Cultural Heritage Act (1986) to allow for the "temporary export of important cultural artefacts".

== Bibliography ==
- Loftus, Ian (2017). The Most Fearless and Gallant Soldier I Have Ever Seen. Lulu.com. ISBN 978-0646949987.
