= List of Australian Victoria Cross recipients =

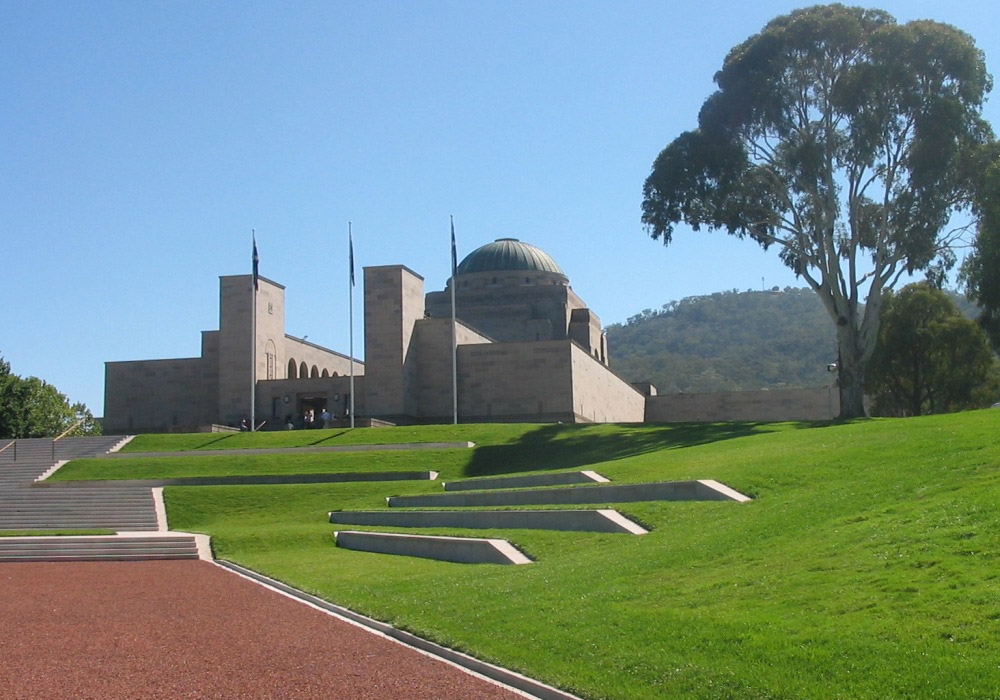
The Australian War Memorial, which currently holds 66 VCs.

The Victoria Cross (VC) is a military decoration awarded for valour "in the presence of the enemy" to members of the Australian Defence Force. It may be awarded to a person of any rank in any service, and to civilians under military command. Being the highest award in the Australian Honours Order of Wearing, the VC takes precedence over all other postnominals and Australian orders and decorations. The VC was instituted by Queen Victoria in 1856, initially to reward acts of valour during the Crimean War. Because of its rarity and inherent significance, the VC is highly prized, both as an award and as a collector's item, with one medal being sold for over A$1 million at auction. Australians have received the VC under the Imperial honours system and later under the Australian Honours System, when in 1991 a new but equivalent award was established by letters patent within the Commonwealth of Australia and its Territories, known as the Victoria Cross for Australia. The Victoria Cross for Australia has been awarded five times: twice to Special Air Service Regiment members, once to a member of the 6th Battalion, Royal Australian Regiment, and a posthumous award to a member of the 2nd Commando Regiment, and a posthumous award to Teddy Sheean. The first four were for actions in the War in Afghanistan while Sheean's was for actions during World War II.

The Imperial VC has been awarded to 96 Australians—91 were received for actions whilst serving with Australian forces, and another five to former members of the Australian forces then serving with South African and British forces. The majority of the awards were for action in the First World War when a total of 64 medals were awarded. Nine of these awards were for action during the Gallipoli Campaign. 20 medals were awarded for action in the Second World War, 6 in the Second Boer War, 4 in the Vietnam War and 2 in the Russian Civil War. Twenty-eight Australians have been awarded the medal posthumously. One recipient—Captain Alfred Shout VC, MC (who was also Mentioned in Despatches)—was Australia's most decorated soldier of the Gallipoli campaign. His Victoria Cross was posthumously awarded after Shout died of his wounds during the Battle of Lone Pine. Another 19 VCs have been awarded to soldiers who were either born in Australia, or died there, but did not serve in Australian units before being awarded the VC, and as such these are not included in this list.

Keith Payne is the only living Australian recipient of the original VC; there are three living recipients of the Victoria Cross for Australia.

== Recipients ==
This, along with the *, indicates that the Victoria Cross was awarded posthumously
AWM = This denotes that the medal is held at the Australian War Memorial

=== Victoria Cross ===
Name	Date of action	Conflict	Unit	Place of action	Location of medal
Charles Anderson	1942	Second World War	2/19th Battalion	Muar River, Malaya	AWM
Thomas Axford	1918	First World War	16th Battalion	Hamel Wood, France	AWM
Peter Badcoe	1967*	Vietnam War	Australian Army Training Team	Huong Tra, Vietnam	AWM
Robert Beatham	1918*	First World War	8th Battalion	Rosieres, France	Queensland Museum; South Bank
Frederick Bell	1901	Second Boer War	West Australia Mounted Infantry	Transvaal, South Africa	Western Australian; Museum
Frederick Birks	1917*	First World War	6th Battalion	Ypres, Belgium	AWM
John Bisdee	1900	Second Boer War	Tasmanian Imperial Bushmen	Warm Bad, South Africa	Tasmanian Museum and Art Gallery
Arthur Blackburn	1916	First World War	10th Battalion	Pozières, France	AWM
Albert Borella	1918	First World War	26th Battalion	Villers-Bretonneux, France	Privately held
Walter Brown	1918	First World War	20th Battalion	Villers-Bretonneux, France	AWM
Alexander Buckley	1918*	First World War	54th Battalion	Péronne, France	AWM
Maurice Buckley	1918	First World War	13th Battalion	Le Verguier, France	AWM
Patrick Bugden	1917*	First World War	31st Battalion	Zonnebeke, Belgium	Queensland Museum; South Bank
Alexander Burton	1915*	First World War	7th Battalion	Gallipoli, Turkey	AWM
John Carroll	1917	First World War	33rd Battalion	St. Yves, Belgium	AWM
George Cartwright	1918	First World War	33rd Battalion	Bouchavesnes, France	Imperial War Museum; London
Claud Castleton	1916*	First World War	Australian Machine Gun Corps	Pozières, France	AWM
Percy Cherry	1917*	First World War	26th Battalion	Lagnicourt, France	AWM
Albert Chowne	1945*	Second World War	2/2nd Battalion	Dagua, New Guinea	AWM
Thomas Cooke	1916*	First World War	8th Battalion	Pozières, France	Army Museum; New Zealand
William Currey	1918	First World War	53rd Battalion	Péronne, France	AWM
Arthur Roden Cutler	1941	Second World War	2/5th Field Regiment, RRoAA	Merdjayoun-Damour, Lebanon	AWM
Henry Dalziel	1918	First World War	15th Battalion	Hamel Wood, France	AWM
Wilbur Dartnell	1915*	First World War	25th (Service) Battalion, Royal Fusiliers	Maktau, Kenya	AWM
Phillip Davey	1918	First World War	10th Battalion	Merris, France	AWM
Tom Derrick	1943	Second World War	2/48th Battalion	Sattelberg, New Guinea	AWM
William Dunstan	1915	First World War	7th Battalion	Gallipoli, Turkey	AWM
John Dwyer	1917	First World War	Australian Machine Gun Corps	Zonnebeke, Belgium	AWM
John Edmondson	1941*	Second World War	2/17th Battalion	Tobruk, Libya	AWM
Hughie Edwards	1941	Second World War	No. 105 Squadron RAF	Bremen, Germany	AWM
Jack French	1942*	Second World War	2/9th Battalion	Milne Bay, Papua	Privately held
Alfred Gaby	1918*	First World War	28th Battalion	Villers-Bretonneux, France	Tasmanian Museum and Art Gallery
Bernard Gordon	1918	First World War	41st Battalion	Bray, France	AWM
Jim Gordon	1941	Second World War	2/31st Battalion	Djezzine, Syria	Privately held
Percy Gratwick	1942*	Second World War	2/48th Battalion	El Alamein, Egypt	Army Museum of Western Australia
Robert Grieve	1917	First World War	37th Battalion	Messines, Belgium	Shrine of Remembrance; Melbourne
Stan Gurney	1942*	Second World War	2/48th Battalion	Tel-el-Eisa, Egypt	AWM
Arthur Hall	1918	First World War	54th Battalion	Péronne, France	AWM
John Hamilton	1915	First World War	3rd Battalion	Gallipoli, Turkey	AWM
George Howell	1917	First World War	1st Battalion	Bullecourt, France	AWM
Neville Howse	1900	Second Boer War	New South Wales Medical Staff Corps	Vredefort, South Africa	AWM
George Ingram	1918	First World War	24th Battalion	Montbrehain, France	AWM
Roy Inwood	1917	First World War	10th Battalion	Polygon Wood, Belgium	Adelaide Town Hall
Albert Jacka	1915	First World War	14th Battalion	Gallipoli, Turkey	AWM
William Jackson	1916	First World War	17th Battalion	Armentieres, France	Privately held
Clarence Jeffries	1917*	First World War	34th Battalion	Passchendaele, Belgium	Christ Church Cathedral, Newcastle, N.S.W.
Jørgen Jensen	1917	First World War	50th Battalion	Noreuil, France	AWM
William Joynt	1918	First World War	8th Battalion	Herleville Wood, France	Melbourne Grammar School
Richard Kelliher	1943	Second World War	2/25th Battalion	Nadzab, New Guinea	AWM
Edward Kenna	1945	Second World War	2/4th Battalion	Wewak, New Guinea	unknown
Bede Kenny	1917	First World War	2nd Battalion	Hermies, France	AWM
Leonard Keysor	1915	First World War	1st Battalion	Gallipoli, Turkey	AWM
Bill Kibby	1942*	Second World War	2/48th Battalion	El Alamein, Egypt	AWM
Bruce Kingsbury	1942*	Second World War	2/14th Battalion	Isurava, Papua	AWM
John Leak	1916	First World War	9th Battalion	Pozières, France	Privately held
Alby Lowerson	1918	First World War	21st Battalion	Mont St. Quentin, France	AWM
Jack Mackey	1945*	Second World War	2/3rd Pioneer Battalion	Tarakan Island, Borneo	AWM
Robert MacTier	1918*	First World War	23rd Battalion	Mont St. Quentin, France	AWM
Joseph Maxwell	1918	First World War	18th Battalion	Estrees, France	AWM
Leslie Maygar	1901	Second Boer War	5th Victorian Mounted Rifles	Geelhoutboom, South Africa	AWM
Dominic McCarthy	1918	First World War	16th Battalion	Madam Wood, France	AWM
Stanley McDougall	1918	First World War	47th Battalion	Dernancourt, France	AWM
Lewis McGee	1917*	First World War	40th Battalion	Ypres, Belgium	Queen Victoria Museum and Art Gallery, Launceston
Frank McNamara	1917	First World War	No. 1 Squadron AFC	Tel el Hesi, Palestine	RAF Museum, London
Ron Middleton	1942*	Second World War	RAAF attached No. 149 Squadron RAF	Turin, Italy	AWM
Mick Moon	1917	First World War	58th Battalion	Bullecourt, France	AWM
Harry Murray	1917	First World War	13th Battalion	Gueudecourt, France	AWM
James Newland	1917	First World War	12th Battalion	Bapaume, France	AWM
Bill Newton	1943*	Second World War	No. 22 Squadron RAAF	New Guinea	AWM
Martin O'Meara	1916	First World War	16th Battalion	Pozières, France	Army Museum of Western Australia
Frank Partridge	1945	Second World War	8th (Militia) Battalion	Bougainville, New Guinea	Privately held
Keith Payne	1969	Vietnam War	Australian Army Training Team	Ben Het, Vietnam	AWM
Samuel Pearse	1919*	North Russia Relief Force	45th Battalion, RF	Emtsa, Russia	AWM
Walter Peeler	1917	First World War	3rd Pioneer Battalion	Ypres, Belgium	AWM
Charles Pope	1917*	First World War	11th Battalion	Louveral, France	AWM
Reg Rattey	1945	Second World War	25th Battalion	Bougainville, New Guinea	Privately held
James Rogers	1901	Second Boer War	South African Constabulary	Thaba 'Nchu, South Africa	AWM
William Ruthven	1918	First World War	22nd Battalion	Ville-sur-Ancre, France	AWM
John Ryan	1918	First World War	55th Battalion	Hindenburg Defences, France	AWM
Clifford Sadlier	1918	First World War	51st Battalion	Villers-Bretonneux, France	St George's Cathedral; Perth W.A.
Alfred Shout	1915*	First World War	1st Battalion	Gallipoli, Turkey	AWM
Ray Simpson	1969	Vietnam War	Australian Army Training Team	Kontum Province, Vietnam	AWM
Leslie Starcevich	1945	Second World War	2/43rd Battalion	Beaufort, British North Borneo	Army Museum of Western Australia
Percy Statton	1918	First World War	40th Battalion	Proyart, France	AWM
Percy Storkey	1918	First World War	19th Battalion	Hangard Wood, France	Army Museum; New Zealand
Arthur Sullivan	1919	North Russia Relief Force	45th Battalion, RF	Sheika River, Russia	AWM
William Symons	1915	First World War	7th Battalion	Gallipoli, Turkey	AWM
Hugo Throssell	1915	First World War	10th Light Horse	Gallipoli, Turkey	AWM
Edgar Towner	1918	First World War	Australian Machine Gun Corps	Mont St. Quentin, France	Privately held
Frederick Tubb	1915	First World War	7th Battalion	Gallipoli, Turkey	AWM
Blair Wark	1918	First World War	32nd Battalion	Bellicourt, France	Queensland Museum; South Bank
Lawrence Weathers	1918	First World War	43rd Battalion	Peronne, France	Privately held
Kevin Wheatley	1965*	Vietnam War	Australian Army Training Team	Tra Bong, Vietnam	AWM
John Whittle	1917	First World War	12th Battalion	Boursies, France	AWM
James Woods	1918	First World War	48th Battalion	Le Verguier, France	AWM
Guy Wylly	1900	Second Boer War	Tasmanian Imperial Bushmen	Warm Bad, South Africa	Tasmanian Museum and Art Gallery

=== Victoria Cross for Australia ===
Name	Date of action	Conflict	Unit	Place of action	Location of medal
Cameron Baird	2013*	War in Afghanistan	2nd Commando Regiment	Khod Valley, Afghanistan	AWM
Mark Donaldson	2008	War in Afghanistan	Special Air Service Regiment	Urozgan Province, Afghanistan	AWM
Daniel Keighran	2010	War in Afghanistan	6th Battalion, Royal Australian Regiment	Urozgan Province, Afghanistan	AWM
Ben Roberts-Smith	2010	War in Afghanistan	Special Air Service Regiment	Kandahar Province, Afghanistan	AWM
Teddy Sheean	1942*	Second World War	HMAS Armidale	Arafura Sea, East Timor	AWM.
Richard Norden	1968*	Vietnam War	1st Battalion, Royal Australian Regiment	Bình Dương province, South Vietnam	

Note: Richard Norden was awarded the Victoria Cross for Australia in 2024 posthumously after his death in 1972 from unrelated causes.
