= Percy Gratwick =

Recipient of the Victoria Cross

Percival Gratwick VC
- Private Percy Gratwick in c. 1940
- Born: 19 October 1902; Katanning, Western Australia
- Died: 26 October 1942 (aged 40); Miteiriya Ridge, El Alamein, Egypt
- Burial place: El Alamein Commonwealth cemetery
- Military career
- Allegiance: Australia
- Branch: Second Australian Imperial Force
- Service years: 1940–1942
- Rank: Private
- Nickname: Percy
- Conflicts: Second World War; North African Campaign; Western Desert Campaign; Siege of Tobruk; Second Battle of El Alamein †
- Awards: Victoria Cross

Percival Eric Gratwick, VC (19 October 1902 – 26 October 1942) was an Australian recipient of the Victoria Cross, the highest award for gallantry in the face of the enemy that can be awarded to British and Commonwealth forces.

== Early life ==
Gratwick was born in Katanning, Western Australia, on 19 October 1902, the fifth son of the local postmaster. Leaving school at 16, he took up various jobs, including a period as a messenger at Parliament House. Later, he worked as a blacksmith, a drover and a prospector.

== Second World War ==
Gratwick sought to join the Second Australian Imperial Force (AIF) after the outbreak of the Second World War. However, issues with his nose, which had been broken years earlier, led to the rejection of his application. In late 1940, after expensive medical treatment on his nose, he attempted to enlist again, this time successfully.

Following completing his training in July 1941, Gratwick embarked on a trip to Libya, where he was assigned to the 2/48th Battalion (a South Australian unit) with the rank of private. The battalion was among the defenders of Tobruk but was transferred to Palestine in October 1941. By June 1942, the battalion was in Egypt.

On the night of 25/26 October 1942, during the Second Battle of El Alamein, Egypt, the platoon to which Gratwick belonged suffered considerable casualties attacking Trig 29, including the platoon commander and sergeant. Gratwick, realising the seriousness of the situation, charged a German machine-gun position by himself and killed the crew with hand grenades. He also killed a mortar crew. Under heavy machine-gun fire, Gratwick then charged a second post, using his rifle and bayonet. In inflicting further casualties, he was killed by machine-gun fire. Still, his brave and determined action, for which he would be awarded a posthumous Victoria Cross, enabled his company to capture the final objective.

Gratwick is buried in El Alamein Commonwealth cemetery, and his Victoria Cross is displayed at the Army Museum of Western Australia in Fremantle, Western Australia. In Port Hedland, Western Australia, Gratwick Street, the Gratwick Aquatic Centre, the town theatre and the community hall are all named in his honour.
