= Ron Middleton (VC) =

Recipient of the Victoria Cross

Rawdon Middleton VC
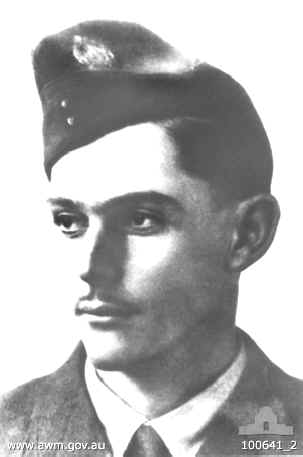
- Rawdon Hume (Ron) Middleton
- Born: 22 July 1916; Sydney, New South Wales
- Died: 29 November 1942 (aged 26); English Channel
- Relatives: Hamilton Hume (great-uncle)
- Military career
- Allegiance: Australia
- Branch: Royal Australian Air Force
- Service years: 1940–42
- Rank: Pilot Officer (posthumously)
- Unit: No. 149 Squadron RAF
- Conflicts: Second World War; European air campaign; Italian bombing campaign; Turin bombing campaign †
- Awards: Victoria Cross

Rawdon Hume "Ron" Middleton, VC (22 July 1916 – 29 November 1942) was a bomber pilot in the Royal Australian Air Force and a posthumous recipient of the Victoria Cross, the highest award for gallantry in the face of the enemy that can be awarded to British and Commonwealth forces.

== Early life ==
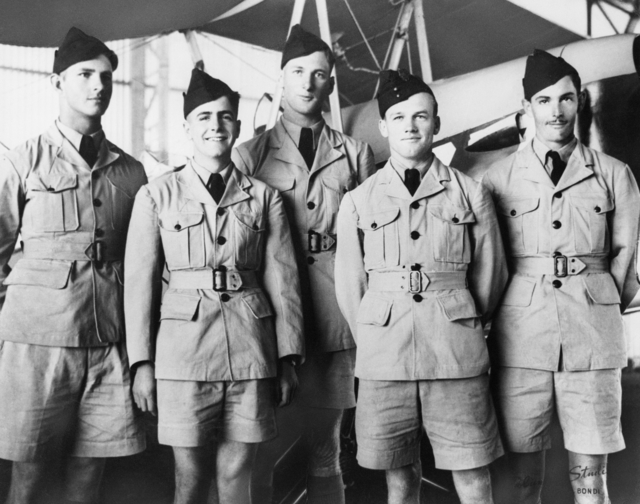
Middleton (far right) and classmates from No. 7 Empire Air Training Scheme course at No. 5 Elementary Flying Training School Narromine posing in front of a Tiger Moth in 1940.

Middleton was born on 22 July 1916 in Waverley, Sydney at Nurse Nettleton's Private Hospital. His younger brother, Osman (a Middleton family name), was born in 1918. His parents had married in 1914. His mother was Faith Lillian (born Millar) and his father Francis Rawdon Middleton, known as Frank, who had been raised at Burrowa. Rawdon Middleton's maternal grandmother, Jessie Huon Middleton, née Hume, was the niece of the colonial explorer, Hamilton Hume. Rawdon Middleton spent the main part of his early years in the Central Western districts of New South Wales where his father was employed managing farming properties.

His father, known as Frank, was working at Muswellbrook in 1914. At some time after his marriage Frank was managing "Warrah" station on the Liverpool Plains of NSW, where in 1920 he was on the Warrah Cricket Association committee. Ron Middleton was a young child on 'Warrah', a very large pastoral property owned by the Australian Agricultural Company and had its own school. FR Middleton left 'Warrah' when Ron was aged 7&1/2 years. The family then moved to 'Kelvin Grove', a smaller farming property near Wallerawang in the Lithgow area. In 1927 Frank Middleton took up the position of station manager on 'Alloway' at Gilgandra for its new owner Mr Geoffrey Mosse of Darling Point, Sydney.

Ron lived on 'Alloway' from the age of 9. He and his brother initially attended the one-teacher Buramilong school on a nearby property and then attended Gilgandra school for his Intermediate Certificate 1930–1932. The optional Leaving Certificate was not provided at Gilgandra school at that time, so when Ron reached that stage of his schooling he boarded in Dubbo, 40 miles away, in 1933–34, to complete his final two years of high school. At Dubbo High School a memorial trust in his name has been operating for many years. He was an athletic young man who competed regularly as a teenager in Gilgandra tennis competitions, played for the Gilgandra district's Berida cricket team and excelled in cricket and rugby football at school. He represented Dubbo High School in tennis in the Astley Cup. The family left 'Alloway' in September 1934. They moved to "Sunnyside", Kentucky, near Uralla (Tamworth area) where Frank was again the station manager.

The family moved once more to Leewang station near Parkes where Frank was again the station manager. Ron Middleton joined his father here, working as a jackaroo. He was working on that property at the time of his enlistment.

He enlisted in the Royal Australian Air Force on 14 October 1940, and trained as a pilot in the Empire Air Training Scheme. He undertook initial flying training at No. 5 Elementary Flying Training School (5 EFTS) Narromine, and advanced training in Canada. In February 1942 he joined No. 149 Squadron of the Royal Air Force, flying as second pilot on Short Stirling bombers. By July of that year he was appointed as an aircraft captain, and flew his first raid as a pilot-in-command against Düsseldorf.

== Victoria Cross action ==
On 28 November 1942, Middleton was captain of Stirling BF372 detailed to bomb the Fiat aircraft works at Turin. It was his twenty-ninth combat sortie, one short of the thirty required for completion of a 'tour' and mandatory rotation off combat operations.

Middleton and his crew arrived above Turin after a difficult flight over the Alps, due to the low combat ceiling of the "bombed-up" and "fueled-up" Stirling (This was due to its short stubby wings, which were designed to keep the wing span low enough to fit in a standard RAF hangar, but which were unable to carry the aircraft to high altitudes.) Over the target area Middleton had to make three low-level passes in order to positively identify the target; on the third, the aircraft was hit by heavy anti-aircraft fire which wounded both pilots and the wireless operator. Middleton suffered numerous grievous wounds, including shrapnel wounds to the arms, legs and body, having his right eye torn from its socket and his jaw shattered.

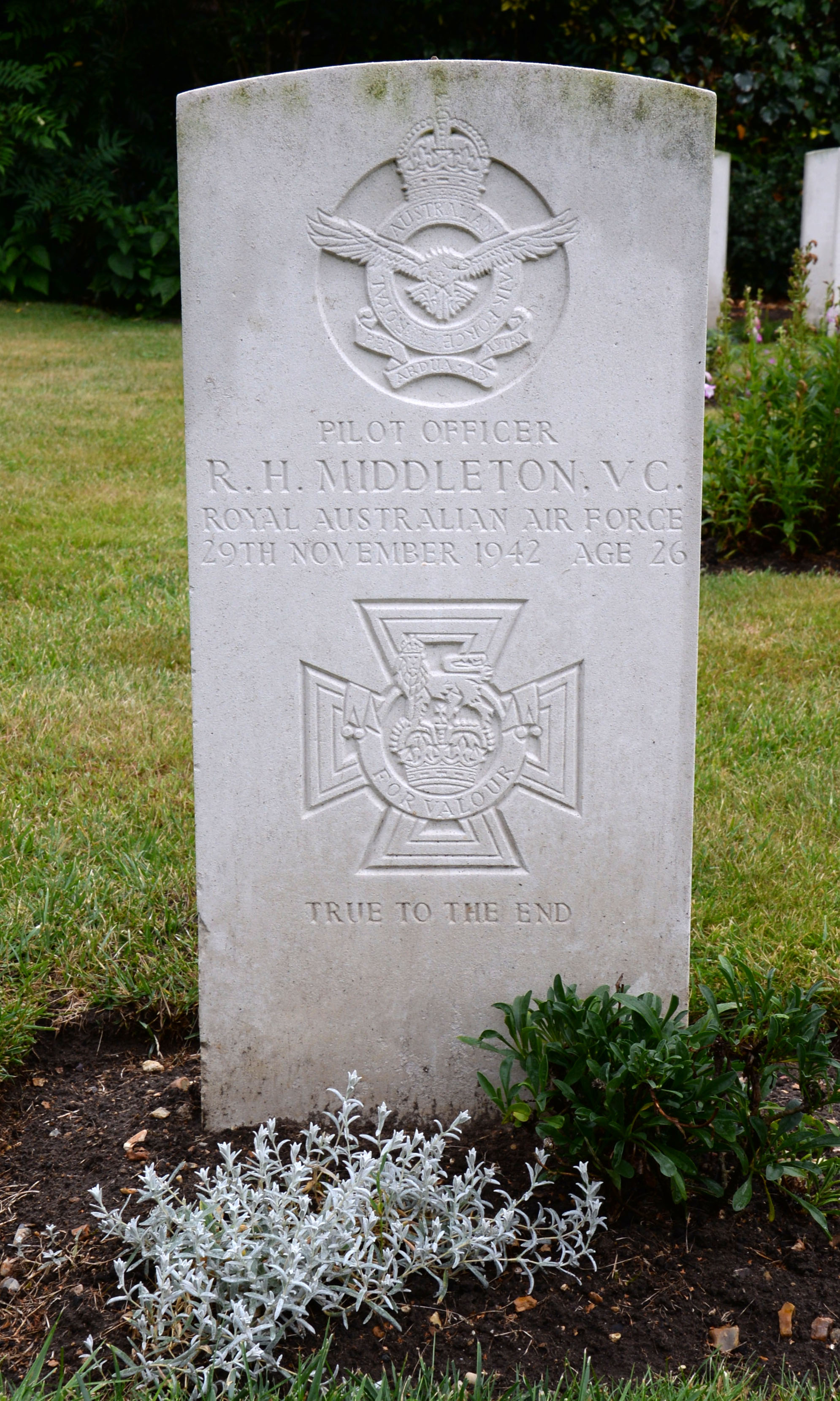
Middleton's grave in Beck Row, Suffolk.

He passed out briefly, and his second pilot, Flight Sergeant L.A. Hyder, who was also seriously wounded, managed to regain control of the plunging plane at 800 feet and drop the bombs, before receiving first aid from the other crew. Middleton regained consciousness in time to help recover control of his stricken bomber. Middleton was in great pain, was barely able to see, was losing blood from wounds all over his body, and could breathe only with difficulty. He must have known that his own chances of survival were slim, but he nonetheless determined to fly his crippled aircraft home, and return his crew to safety. During the return flight he frequently said over the intercom "I'll make the English Coast. I'll get you home". After four hours of agony and having been further damaged by flak over France, Middleton reached the coast of England with five minutes of fuel reserves. At this point he turned the aircraft parallel to the coast and ordered his crew to bail out. Five of his crew did so and landed safely, but his front gunner and flight engineer remained with him to try to talk him into a forced landing on the coast, something he must have known would have risked extensive civilian casualties. He steered the aircraft out over the sea, off Dymchurch, and ordered the last two crew to bail out. They then too bailed out, but did not survive the night in the English Channel. Middleton stayed with the aircraft, which crashed into the Channel. His body was washed ashore on 1 February 1943. He was buried with full military honors on 5 February 1943 in Suffolk.

The last line of his Victoria Cross citation reads: "His devotion to duty in the face of overwhelming odds is unsurpassed in the annals of the Royal Air Force".

Middleton was posthumously promoted to pilot officer, and is buried at Beck Row, [Mildenhall], Suffolk. His Victoria Cross and uniform are displayed at the Australian War Memorial in Canberra.

Pilot Officers George Royde (navigator) and Norman Skinner (wireless operator) were awarded the Distinguished Flying Cross, while Flight Sergeant Leslie Hyder (2nd pilot), Flight Sergeant Douglas Cameron (mid-upper gunner) and Sergeant H.W. Gough (rear gunner) each received the Distinguished Flying Medal. Coincidentally, Cameron (as a flying officer) would be a member of Squadron Leader Ian Willoughby Bazalgette's crew when the Canadian would be awarded a posthumous Victoria Cross in 1944.

== Legacy ==
Middleton has been honoured by the naming of the mess, the 'Middleton VC Club' at 1 RAAF Recruit Training Unit, RAAF Base Wagga.

He was on one of 1995 Australia Remembers 45c stamps.

The dining hall located at RAF Mildenhall in Suffolk is named after Middleton.

In Parkes NSW, the suburb of Middleton and Middleton Public School are named for him.

In Gilgandra NSW, the road that leads to the local Aerodrome - Middleton Memorial Drive - is named in his honour.

In Dubbo NSW, in Victoria Park adjacent to the Cenotaph, there is a bronze bust of him with a plaque with his VC citation.

The sports centre at Thomas Hassall Anglican College in Sydney is named after him, with photos of him and his VC citation taking pride of place in the sports hall.

In Beck Row, Suffolk, U.K., Middleton's grave can be found amongst 73 located in the Commonwealth War Grave plot at St John's Parish Church (https://www.cwgc.org/visit-us/find-cemeteries-memorials/cemetery-details/44309/beck-row-st-john-churchyard/). Along St John’s St, close to his grave, a road is named after him, Middleton Close, with a small memorial plaque at the entrance to the road.

Road named in honour of Ron Middleton VC, in Beck Row, Suffolk, UK, close to his grave in St John's Church

Memorial plaque for Ron Middleton at Middleton Close, Beck Row, Suffolk, UK.

== Bibliography ==
- Bill, Stuart (1991). Middleton VC: The Life of Pilot Officer Rawdon Hume Middleton, VC of the Royal Australian Air Force as Remembered by His Friends and Colleagues. East Bentleigh: S. & L. Bill. ISBN 0-646-00337-2.
