= Pozières Memorial =

Memorial located in Somme, in France

- Commonwealth War Graves Commission
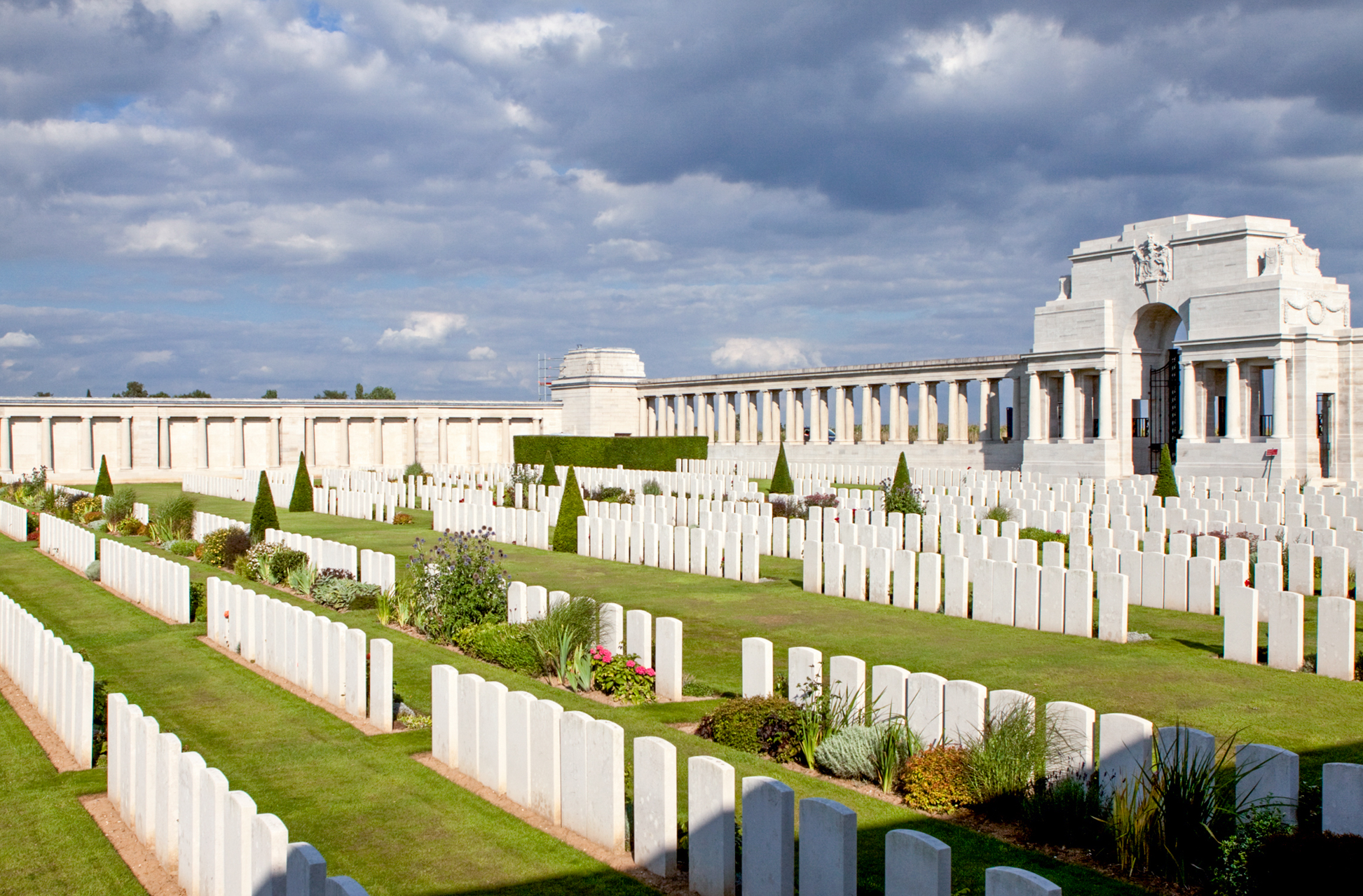
- View looking east across the cemetery, with colonnades of memorial panels in the background
- For forces of the United Kingdom and South Africa
- Unveiled: 4 August 1930
- Location: 50°02′03″N 02°42′55″E
- Designed by: William Harrison Cowlishaw; Laurence A. Turner (sculptor)
- In memory of the officers and men of the Fifth and Fourth Armies who fought on the Somme battlefields 21 March – 7 August 1918 and to those of their dead who have no known grave

UNESCO World Heritage Site
- Official name: Funerary and memory sites of the First World War (Western Front)
- Type: Cultural
- Criteria: i, ii, vi
- Designated: 2023 (45th session)
- Reference no.: 1567-SE04

The Pozières Memorial is a World War I memorial, located near the commune of Pozières, in the Somme department of France, and unveiled in August 1930. It lists the names of 14,657 British and South African soldiers of the Fifth and Fourth Armies with no known grave who were killed between 21 March 1918 and 7 August 1918, during the German advance known as the Spring Offensive (21 March–18 July), and the period of Allied consolidation and recovery that followed. The final date is determined by the start of the period known as the Advance to Victory on 8 August.

The memorial forms the perimeter walls of a Commonwealth War Graves Commission cemetery, which principally contains the bodies of men killed during the Battle of Pozières and the Battle of the Somme in 1916.

== Memorial ==
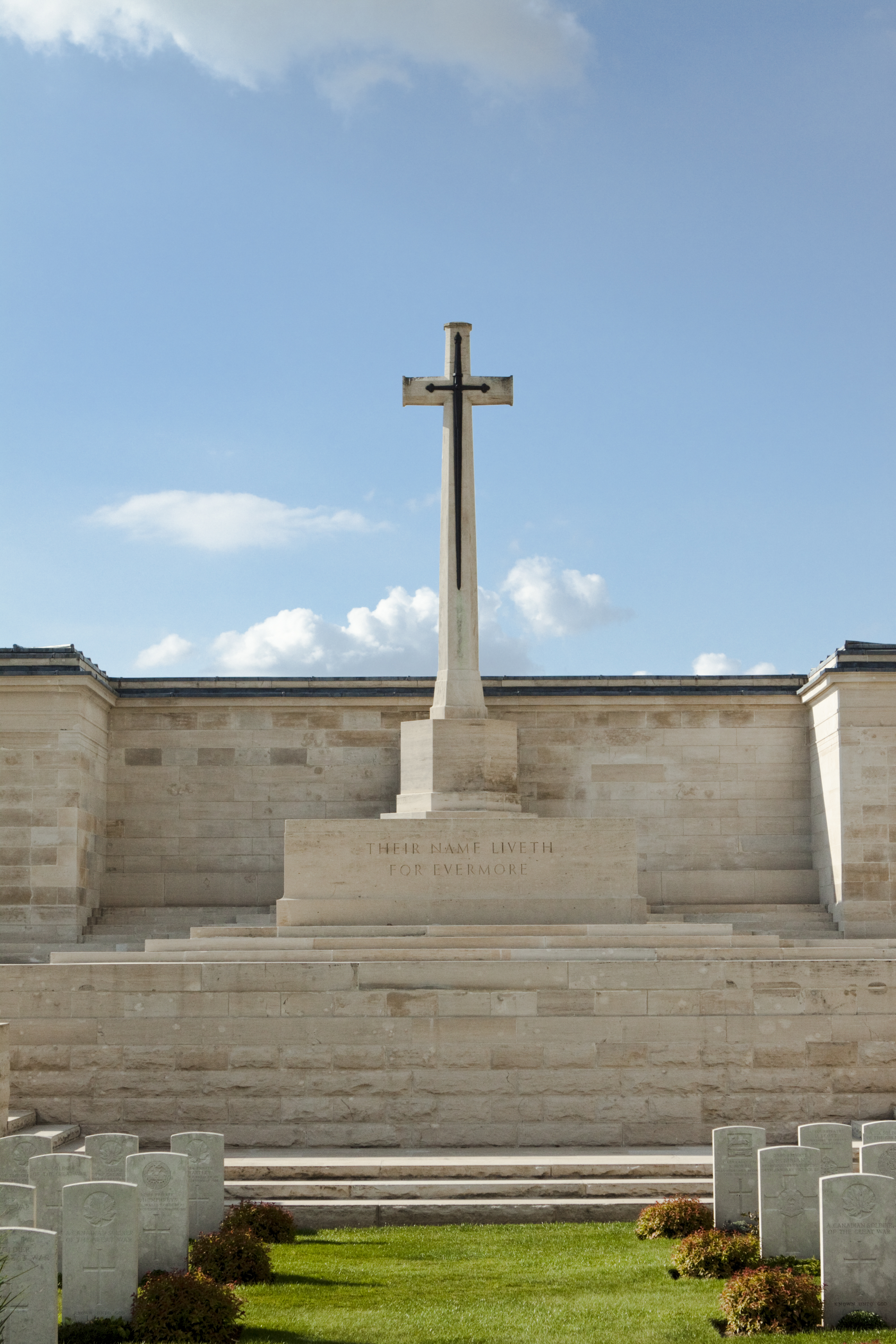
The Cross of Sacrifice

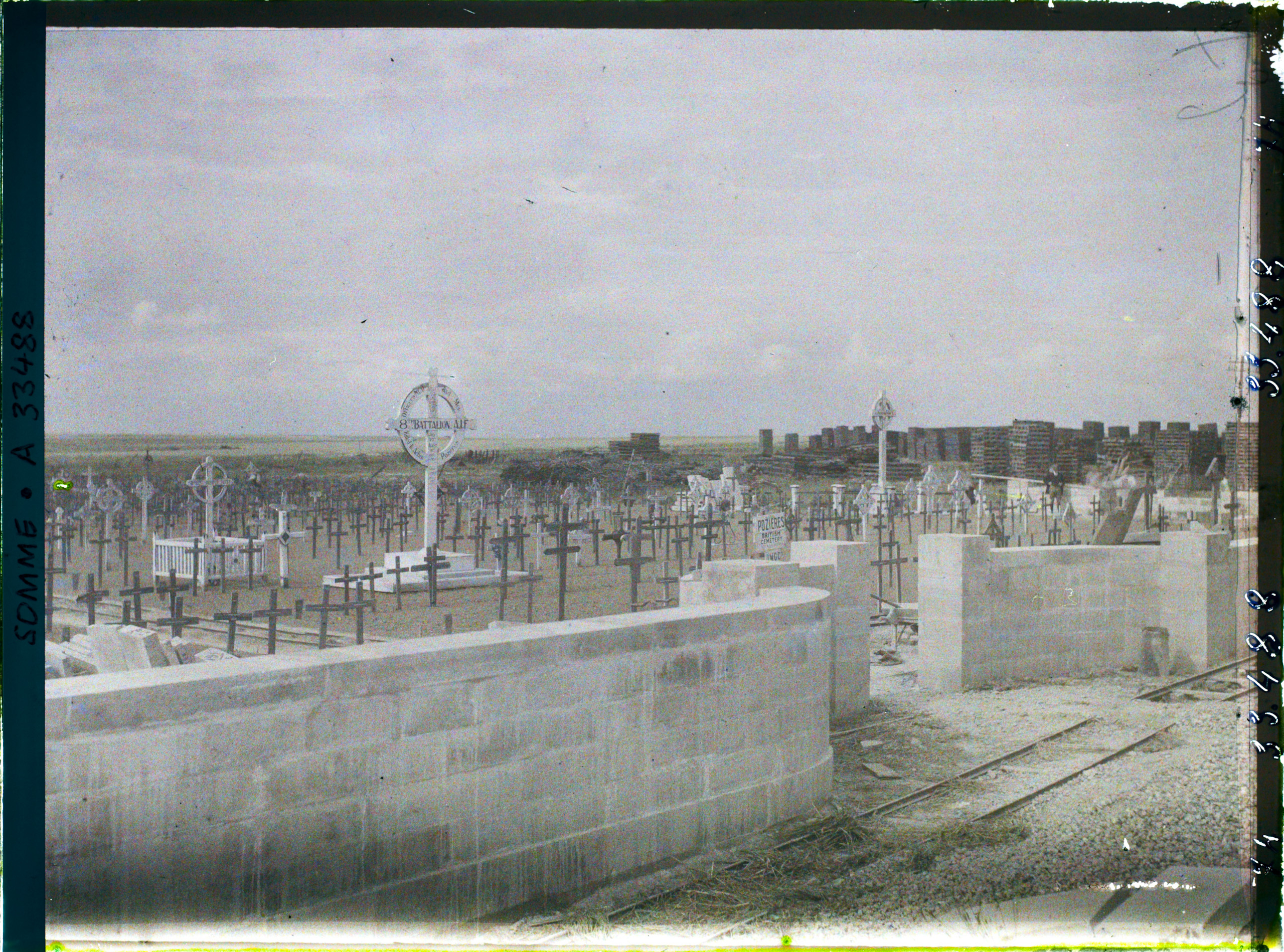
The cemetery in 1922, prior to the construction of the memorial

The memorial commemorates the missing of the British Fifth Army, and to a lesser extent of the Fourth Army (re-formed to turn the tide of battle following the virtual disintegration of the Fifth Army). The original intention was that the memorial at Pozières should commemorate the missing of the Third Army, while those of the Fifth Army would be commemorated at Saint-Quentin, at the heart of the Army's sector in March 1918. However, the French authorities objected to the amount of land being taken for British memorials, and so the names of the Third Army missing were added to the Arras Memorial, while the Fifth Army memorial was situated here, despite the fact that Pozières lay on the wrong side of the River Somme from the area in which those named had died.

The memorial was designed by William Harrison Cowlishaw, with sculpture by Laurence A. Turner. It consists of a colonnade of wall panels forming three sides of the perimeter of a cemetery, and incorporating a Cross of Sacrifice. The names of the missing are inscribed on the panels, arranged by regiment or other unit. The fourth side of the cemetery, on the road frontage, is formed by an open arcade, with the entrance archway at its centre: the inscription is over this. The memorial was unveiled on 4 August 1930 by Sir Horace Smith-Dorrien, who had served as a general commanding the British II Corps and the British Second Army during the war.

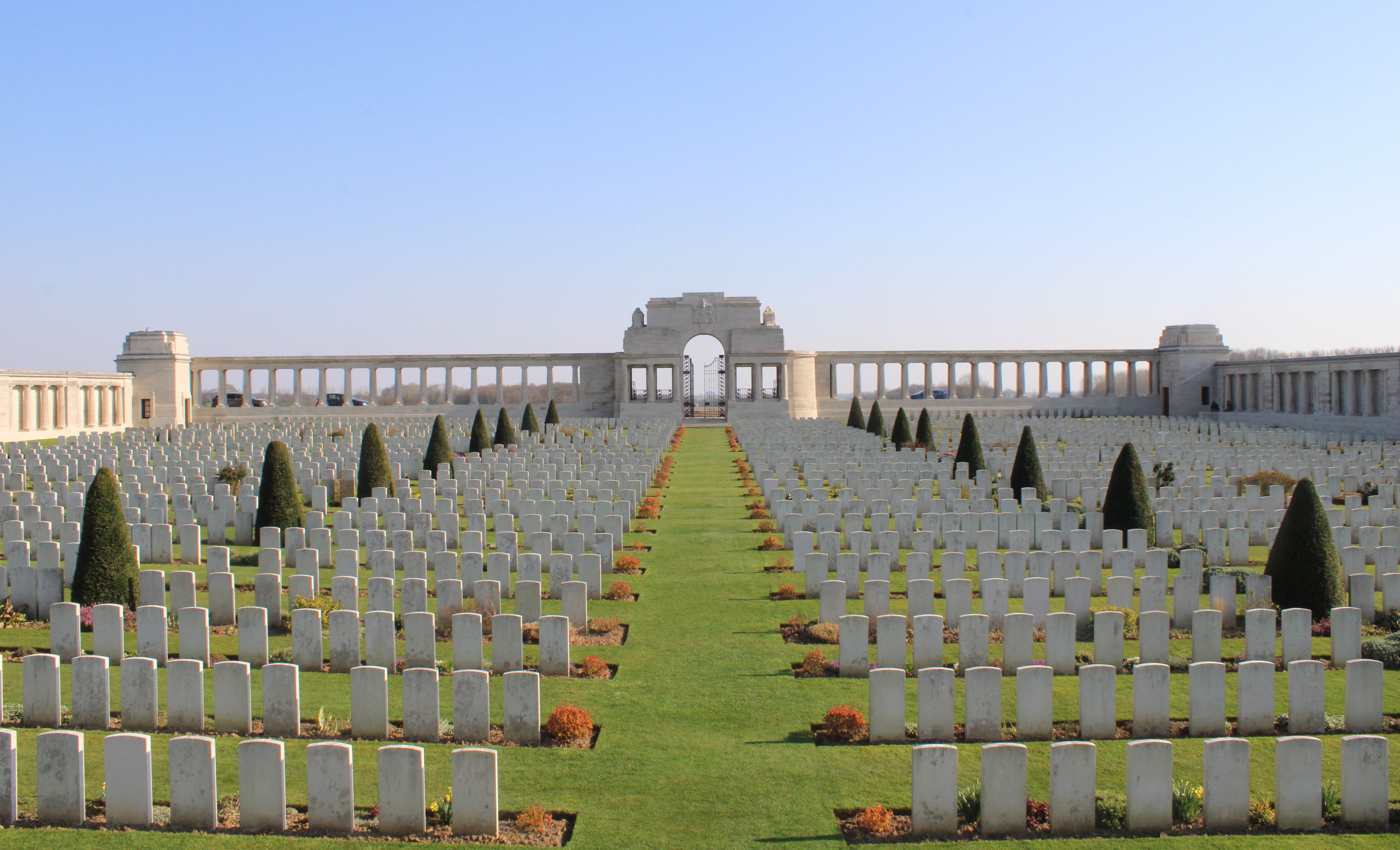
View looking south-east across the cemetery towards the entrance archway

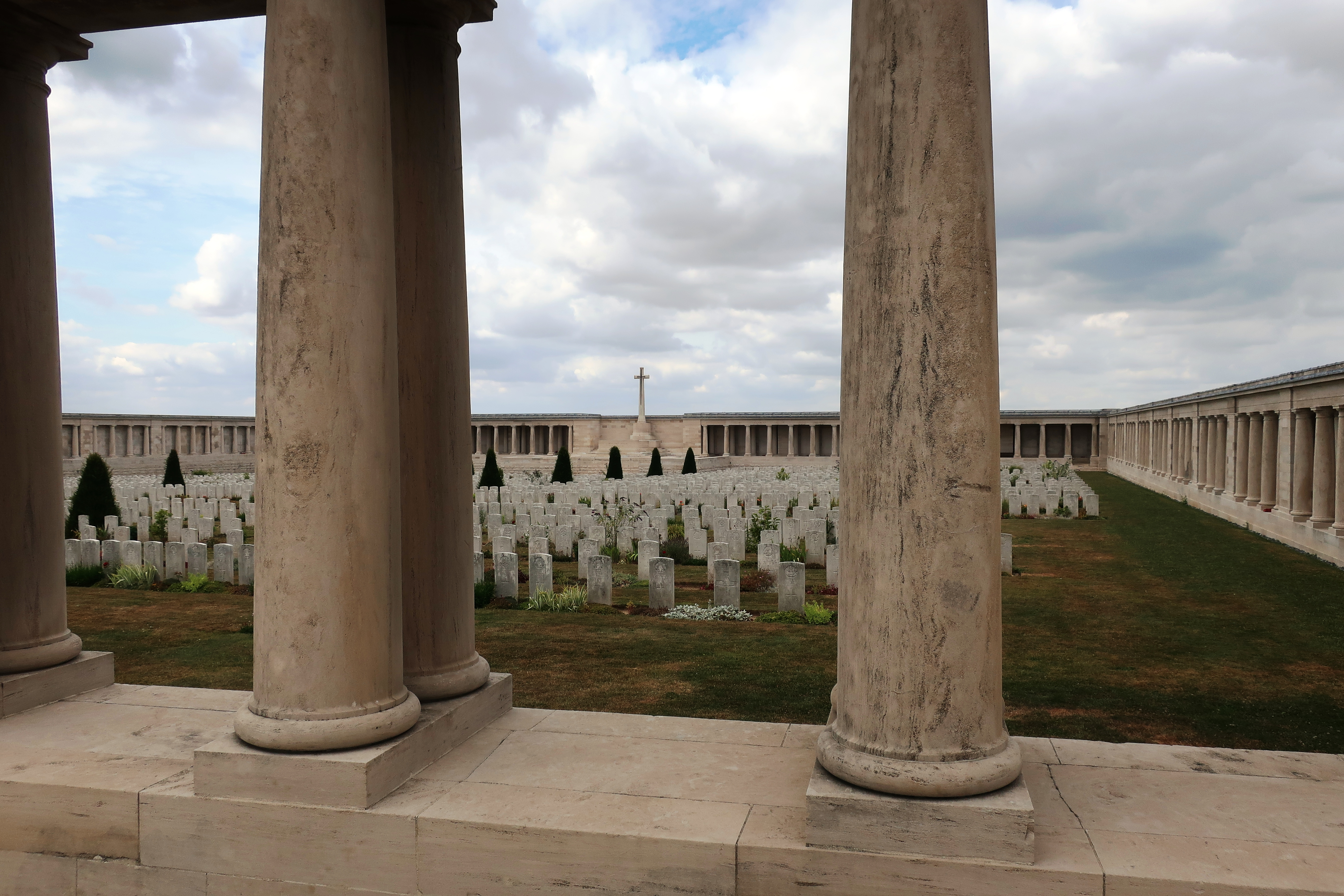
View looking north-west towards the Cross of Sacrifice

== Cemetery ==
The memorial encloses a Commonwealth War Graves Commission cemetery, in which 2,758 Commonwealth servicemen are either buried or commemorated. Plot II (occupying less than one sixth of the site) is an original plot of 1916–18, containing 272 burials. The rest of the cemetery contains graves moved here from surrounding areas following the Armistice, the majority being those of soldiers killed during the Battle of Pozières and the latter stages of the Battle of the Somme in 1916. A few belong to men killed in August 1918 during the Advance to Victory. Approximately half the graves are those of unidentified bodies: of those identified, the majority belong to Australian soldiers. 57 Germans were buried here in 1918, but most of their remains were moved after the war, leaving just a single German grave.

== Notable commemorations ==
=== Brigade commander ===
The most senior officer commemorated on the Memorial is Brigadier-General G. N. B. Forster of the 14th (Light) Division, killed on 4 April 1918 when his brigade was in action near Villers-Bretonneux.

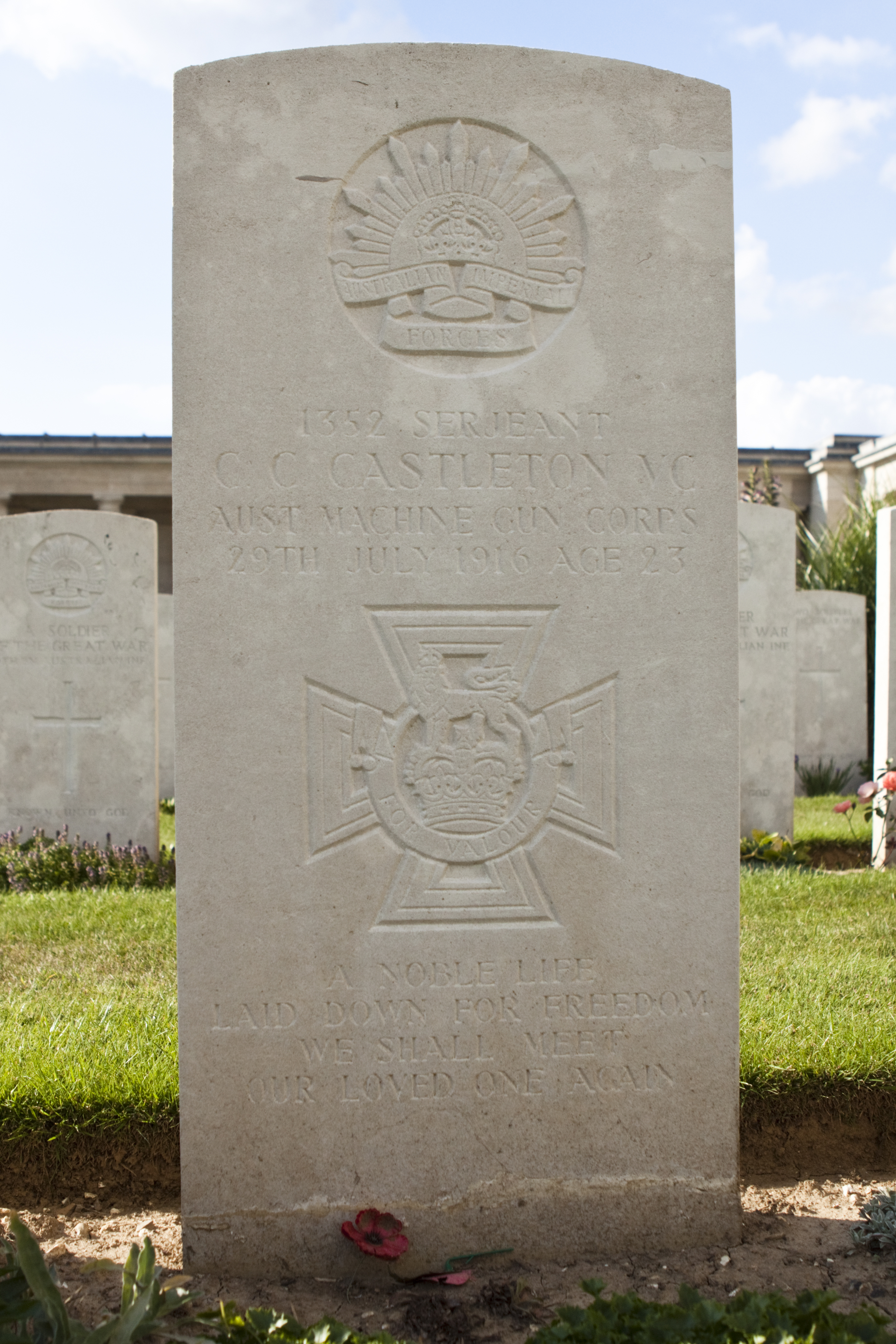
Headstone of Claud Castleton

=== Victoria Crosses ===
One Victoria Cross recipient is buried in the cemetery: he is Sergeant Claud Castleton of the Australian Machine Gun Corps, killed on 29 July 1916.

Three Victoria Cross recipients are commemorated on the Memorial, under their respective units:

- Private Herbert Columbine, Machine Gun Corps (killed on 22 March 1918)
- Second Lieutenant Edmund De Wind, Royal Irish Rifles (killed on 21 March 1918)
- Lieutenant-Colonel Wilfrith Elstob, Manchester Regiment (killed on 21 March 1918)

Distinguished Conduct Medal

Sergeant Percy W Pickles DCM. 4th Queens Own Hussars (killed on 31 March 1918) is commemorated on the Memorial

Lance Corporal Francis George Preece DCM 28667 13th Bth Gloucestershire Regiment. Awarded DCM for actions in Feb 1918, in which he discharged a Bangalore into an enemy shelter. Died of shrapnel wounds during Germany’s Spring Offensive, 22 March 1918. (Quote: considerable loss by his battalion, the corporal of his section and of course his loving wife Ada). Lies in mass grave and is commemorated on the Memorial Wall.
