= Herbert George Columbine =

Recipient of the Victoria Cross

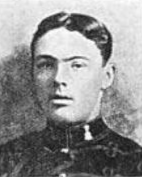
- Born: 28 November 1893; Penge, London, England
- Died: 22 March 1918 (aged 24); Hervilly Wood, France
- Burial place: Remembered on the Pozieres Memorial
- Military career
- Allegiance: United Kingdom
- Branch: British Army
- Service years: 1911–1918 †
- Rank: Private
- Units: 19th Hussars; Machine Gun Corps
- Conflicts: World War I
- Awards: Victoria Cross

Herbert George Columbine VC (28 November 1893 – 22 March 1918) was an English recipient of the Victoria Cross, the highest and most prestigious award for gallantry in the face of the enemy that can be awarded to British and Commonwealth forces.

== Biography ==
Columbine was born in London on 28 November 1893. He joined the British Army in 1911 as a private in the 19th Royal Hussars, and later transferred to the 9th Squadron, Machine Gun Corps. He served in the First World War beginning in August 1914. He was 24 years old when the action for which he was awarded the VC took place.

On 22 March 1918 at Hervilly Wood, France, Private Columbine took over command of a Vickers gun and kept firing it from 9 a.m. to 1 p.m. in an isolated position with no wire in front. During this time wave after wave of the enemy failed to get up to him, but at last with the help of a low-flying aircraft the enemy managed to gain a strong foothold in the trench. As the position was now untenable, Private Columbine told the two remaining men to get away, and although he was being bombed on either side, he kept his gun firing, inflicting losses, until he was killed by a bomb which blew him up along with his gun.

== Commemoration ==
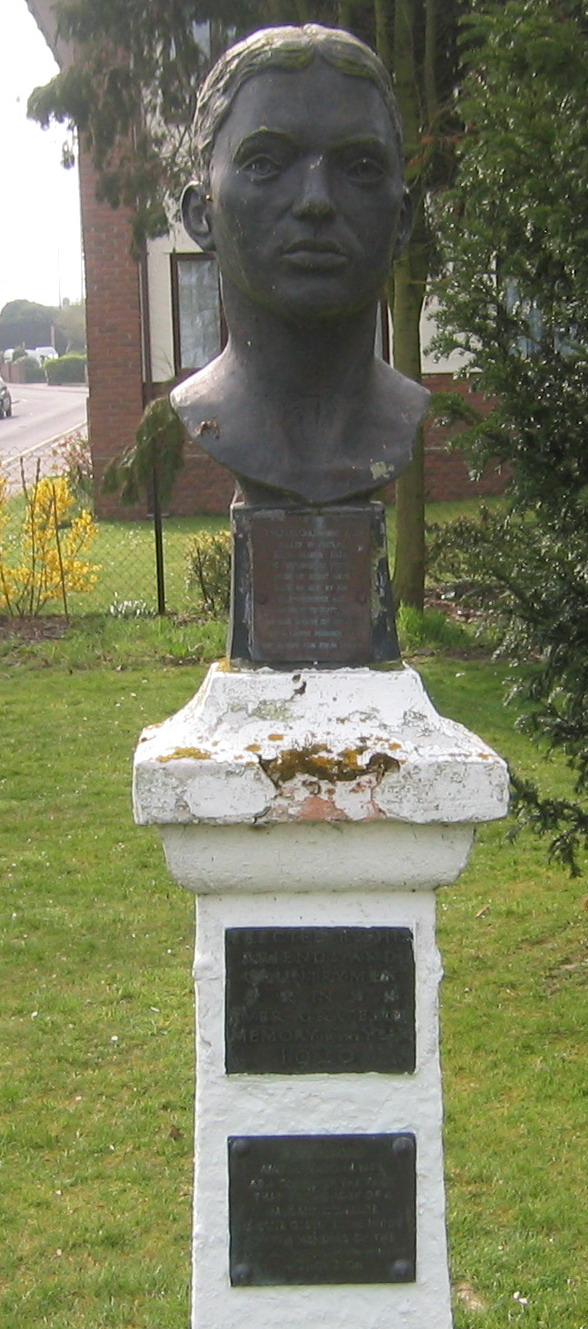
Herbert Columbine memorial at Walton on the Naze, Essex

Columbine is named on the Pozières Memorial, in the Somme department of France, to the missing of the Fifth Army.

The Columbine Centre, a leisure and community centre in Walton-on-the-Naze, is named after him.

The Columbine Statue Fund was set up under the patronage of Dame Judi Dench to raise money for a statue to Columbine in Walton on the Naze. The statue, sculpted by John Doubleday, was erected on 1 August 2014 on the seafront at Walton on the Naze.

== Bibliography ==
- Gliddon, Gerald (2013) [2004]. Spring Offensive 1918. VCs of the First World War. The History Press. ISBN 978-0-7524-8730-4.
