= Claud Castleton =

Australian recipient of the Victoria Cross

Claud Charles Castleton
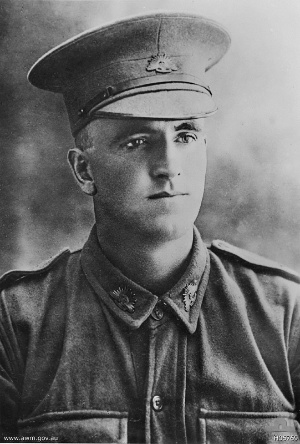
- Sergeant Claud Castleton, c. 1915–16
- Born: 12 April 1893; Kirkley, Lowestoft, England
- Died: 29 July 1916 (aged 23); Pozières, France
- Military career
- Allegiance: Australia
- Branch: Australian Army
- Service years: 1915–16
- Rank: Sergeant
- Units: 5th Machine Gun Company, 5th Brigade
- Conflicts: First World War; Battle of the Somme; Battle of Pozières †
- Awards: Victoria Cross

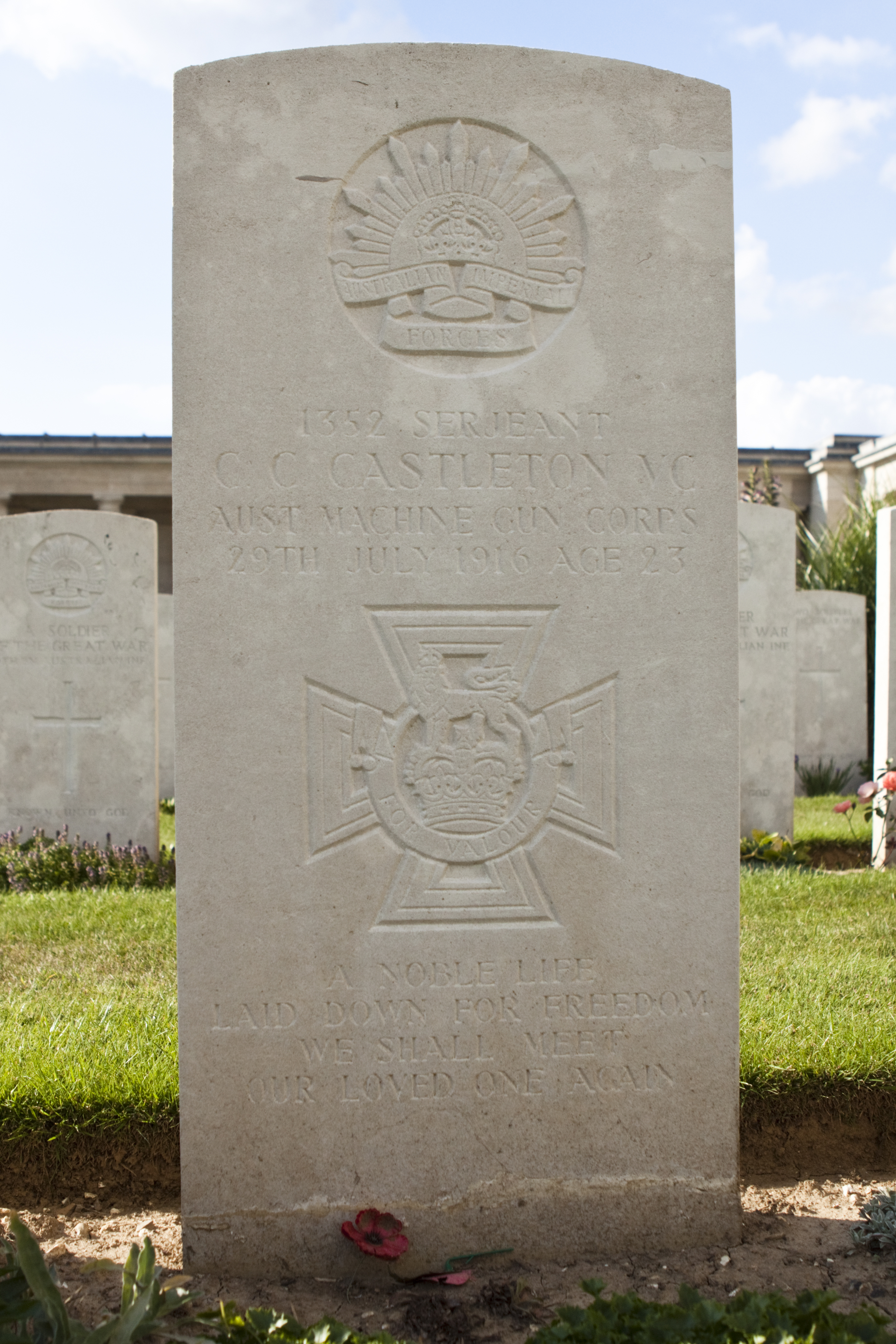
Castleton's grave

Claud Charles Castleton, VC (12 April 1893 – 29 July 1916) was an Australian recipient of the Victoria Cross, the highest award for gallantry in the face of the enemy that can be awarded to British and Commonwealth forces.

== Early life ==
Claud Castleton was born in Kirkley, Lowestoft, England. Educated at a council school, he won a scholarship to the grammar school. In 1912 he set off on a long adventure, stopping first at Melbourne, Australia. He worked in various parts of Australia before heading to New Guinea, intending to earn funds for the return journey to England via New Zealand, India and Africa. Matters changed with the outbreak of the First World War; he joined the Australian force formed in New Guinea for the defence of the area in the face of German warship activities.

== First World War ==
In March 1915 Castleton returned to Sydney and enlisted in the Australian Imperial Force. He subsequently served at Gallipoli, where he earned promotion. He later transferred to the Australian Machine Gun Corps. He was 23 years old, and a sergeant in the 5th Machine Gun Company, 5th Brigade, 2nd Division when the following deed took place for which he was awarded the VC.

On the night of the 28/29 July 1916 near Pozières, France, during a night attack the infantry was temporarily driven back by the intense machine-gun fire from the enemy trenches. Many wounded were left in "No Man's Land" lying in shell holes. Sergeant Castleton went out twice in the face of this intense fire, and each time brought in a wounded man on his back. He went out a third time and was bringing in another wounded man when he was himself hit in the back and killed instantly.

Castleton is buried at Pozières British Military Cemetery, Somme, France, 3 miles NE of Albert (Plot IV, Row L, Grave 43). The inscription on his gravestone reads: A NOBLE LIFE LAID DOWN FOR FREEDOM WE SHALL MEET OUR LOVED ONE AGAIN.

== Legacy ==
Castleton's Victoria Cross is displayed at the Australian War Memorial in Canberra. Castleton Crescent in the Canberra suburb of Gowrie was named in his honour. There is a brass plaque to him at the former South Cliff Congregational Church, now St Nicholas's Catholic Church, in south Lowestoft.
