= Machine Gun Corps =

British Army corps of 1915–1922

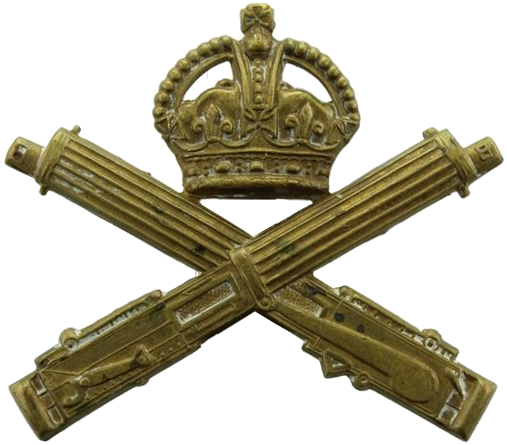
- Cap badge of the Machine Gun Corps.
- Active: 1915–1922
- Country: United Kingdom
- Branch: British Army
- March: Quick: The Happy Clown
- Engagements: First World War

The Machine Gun Corps (MGC) was a corps (regiment) of the British Army, formed in October 1915 in response to the need for more effective use of machine guns on the Western Front in the First World War. The Heavy Branch of the MGC was the first to use tanks in combat and was subsequently turned into the Tank Corps, later called the Royal Tank Regiment. The MGC remained in existence after the war until it was disbanded in 1922.

== Formation ==
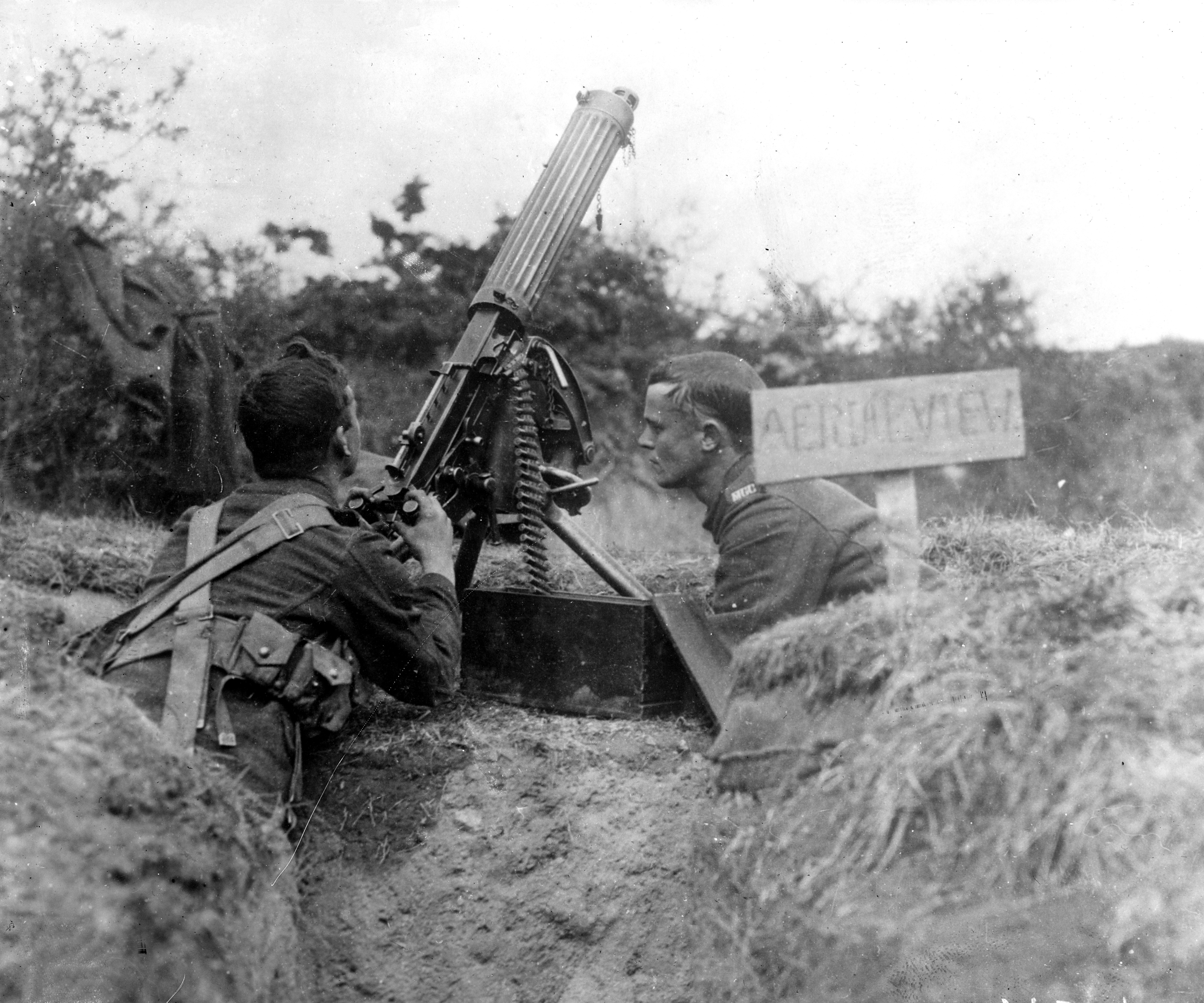
An MGC gun team with their Vickers machine gun.

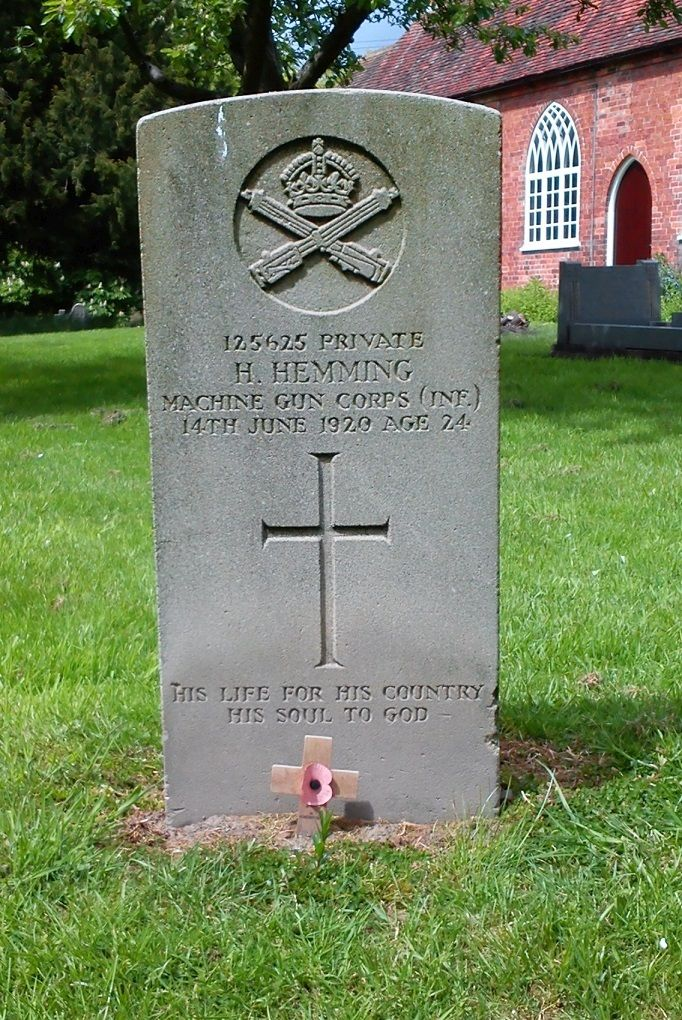
Grave of H. Hemming, Machine Gun Corps (Infantry Branch), in Worcestershire.

At the outbreak of the First World War in August 1914, the tactical potential of machine guns was not appreciated by the British Armed Forces. The prevalent attitude of senior ranks at the outbreak of the Great War can be summed up by the opinion of an officer expressed a decade earlier that a single battery of machine guns per army corps was a sufficient level of issue.

Despite the evidence of fighting in Manchuria (1905 onwards) the army went to war with each infantry battalion and cavalry regiment containing a machine gun section of just two guns. This was soon increased to four guns per section.

These organic (embedded) units were supplemented in November 1914 by the formation of the Motor Machine Gun Service (MMGS) administered by the Royal Artillery, consisting of motor-cycle mounted machine gun batteries.

A machine gun school was also opened in France.

After a year of warfare on the Western Front some commanders advocated crewing them with specially trained men who were not only thoroughly conversant with their weapons but understood how they should be best deployed for maximum effect. To achieve this, the Machine Gun Corps was formed in October 1915 – by Command of Brigadier H.B. de Lisle to Captain Ross McGillycuddy (4th Royal Irish Dragoon Guards) with Infantry, Cavalry, and Motor branches, followed in 1916 by the Heavy Branch. A depot and training centre was established at Belton Park near Grantham, Lincolnshire, and a base depôt at Camiers in France. Captain, then Major, McGillycuddy attended an earlier Machine Gun School at Hythe. He formed there, as an ex-Gunner, certain theories on the use of the Machine Gun from which he was able to turn to good account in the war of 1914 to 1918.

== Branches ==
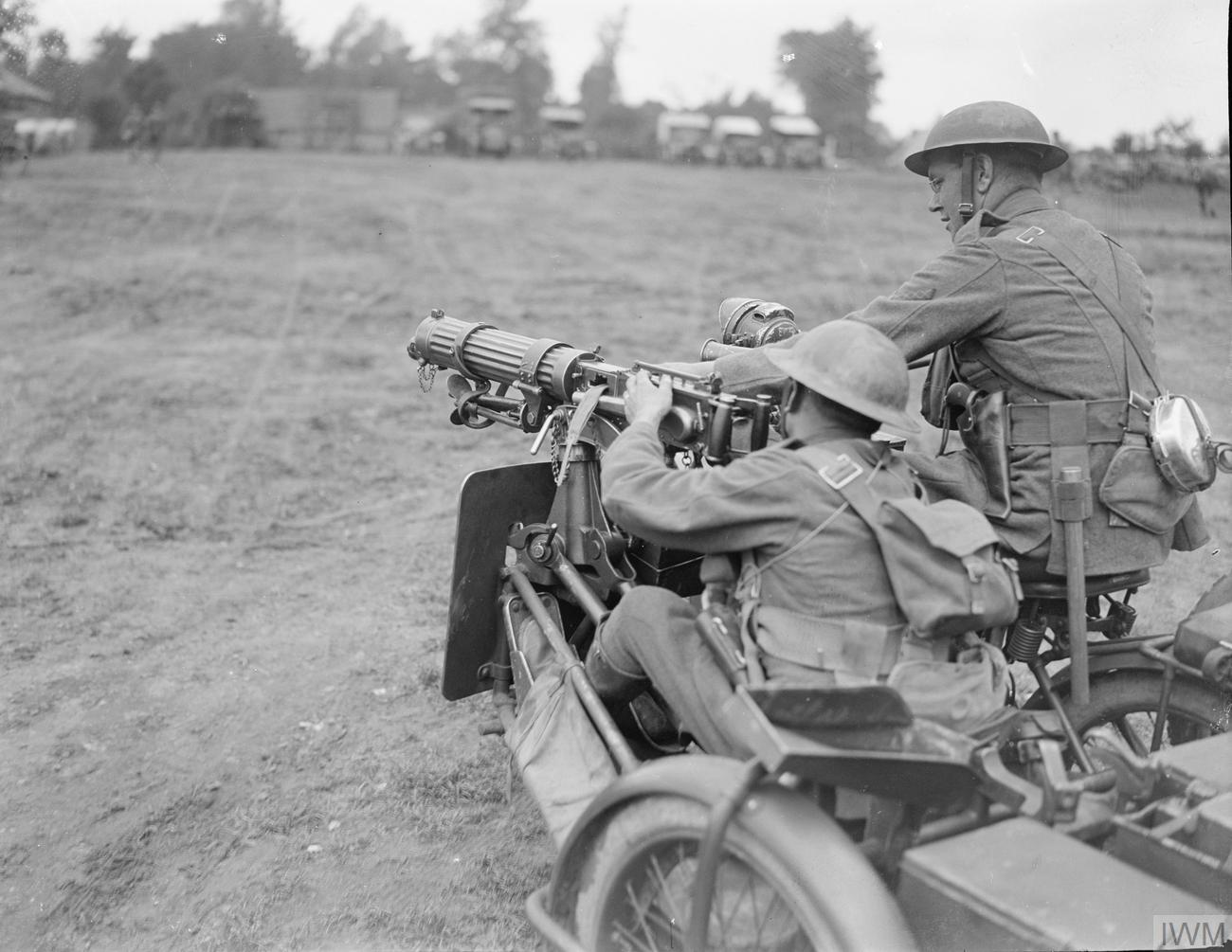
Men of the Machine Gun Corps Motor Branch, with their sidecar motorcycle, June 1918.

- The Infantry Branch was by far the largest and was formed by the transfer of battalion machine gun sections to the MGC. These sections were grouped into Brigade Machine Gun Companies, three per division and a specialist officer was added to each brigade headquarters to coordinate their use. New companies were raised at Grantham. In 1917, a fourth company was added to each division. In February and March 1918, the four companies in each division were formed into a Machine Gun Battalion. The Infantry Branch was dependent on horse drawn transport. Each section of four guns required two wagons for the guns and a third for 32,000 rounds of ammunition.
- The Guards Division formed its own machine gun support unit, the Guards Machine Gun Regiment.
- The Cavalry Branch consisted of Machine Gun Squadrons, one per cavalry brigade.
- The Motor Branch was formed by absorbing the Motor Machine Gun Service and the armoured car squadrons of the recently disbanded Royal Naval Armoured Car Service. It formed several types of units: motor cycle batteries, light armoured motor batteries (LAMB) and light car patrols. As well as motor cycles, other vehicles used included Rolls-Royce and Ford Model T cars.
- The Heavy Section was formed on 1 May 1916, becoming the Heavy Branch in November of that year. Men of C and D Companies of this branch crewed the first tanks in action at the Battle of Flers-Courcelette, during the Battle of the Somme on 15-16 September 1916 and throughout the Autumn. In July 1917, the Heavy Branch separated from the MGC to become the Tank Corps, later called the Royal Tank Regiment.

There was also a Canadian Machine Gun Corps.

== First World War ==
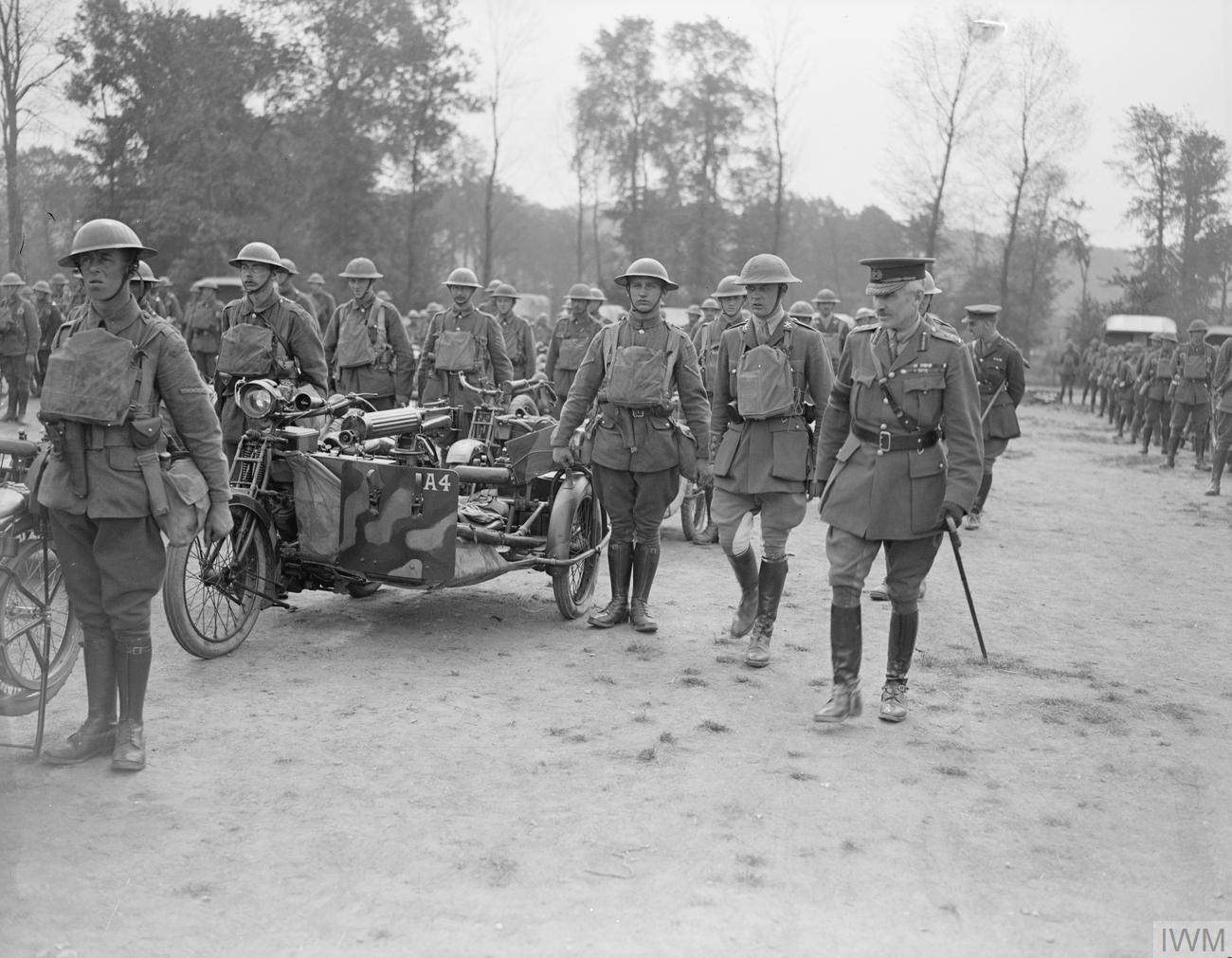
General Sir Henry Horne, commanding the British First Army, inspecting the 24th Motor Machine Gun Battalion at Dieval, 12 June 1918. The motorbikes are Clyno 744 cc twin cylinder machines fitted with a sidecar and Vickers machine-guns.

The MGC saw action in all the main theatres of war, including the Western Front in France and Belgium, Sinai and Palestine Campaign, Mesopotamian campaign, Egypt, Salonika, East Africa campaign and Italian front. In its short history, the MGC gained an enviable record for heroism as a front line fighting force. In the latter part of the war, as tactics changed to defence in depth, it commonly served well in advance of the front line. It had a less enviable record for its casualty rate. Some 170,500 officers and men served in the MGC, with 62,049 becoming casualties, including 12,498 killed, earning it the nickname 'the Suicide Club'.

While the undeniable bravery and self-sacrifice of the corps stands testament to the men and their regimental esprit de corps it is also a symptom of the fixed belief on the part of senior commanders that machine guns were confined to a marginal if useful role, that of an adjunct to massed rifle fire, ignoring the proven potential of this weapon in the indirect role (in effect rifle-calibre fire employed as ultra-short artillery.) By correctly setting up the same weapons more commonly used in the direct role (over open sights) the delivering of accurate and sustained fire at high elevation became less an art than a science that could reliably deliver plunging fire at approximately twice the maximum effective range of hand-held weapons of identical calibre, but not so convincingly a belief to hold that the machine gunners were in effect hiding behind the front lines while uselessly firing into the air, making a show instead of dying beside riflemen whose weapons used practically identical ammunition.

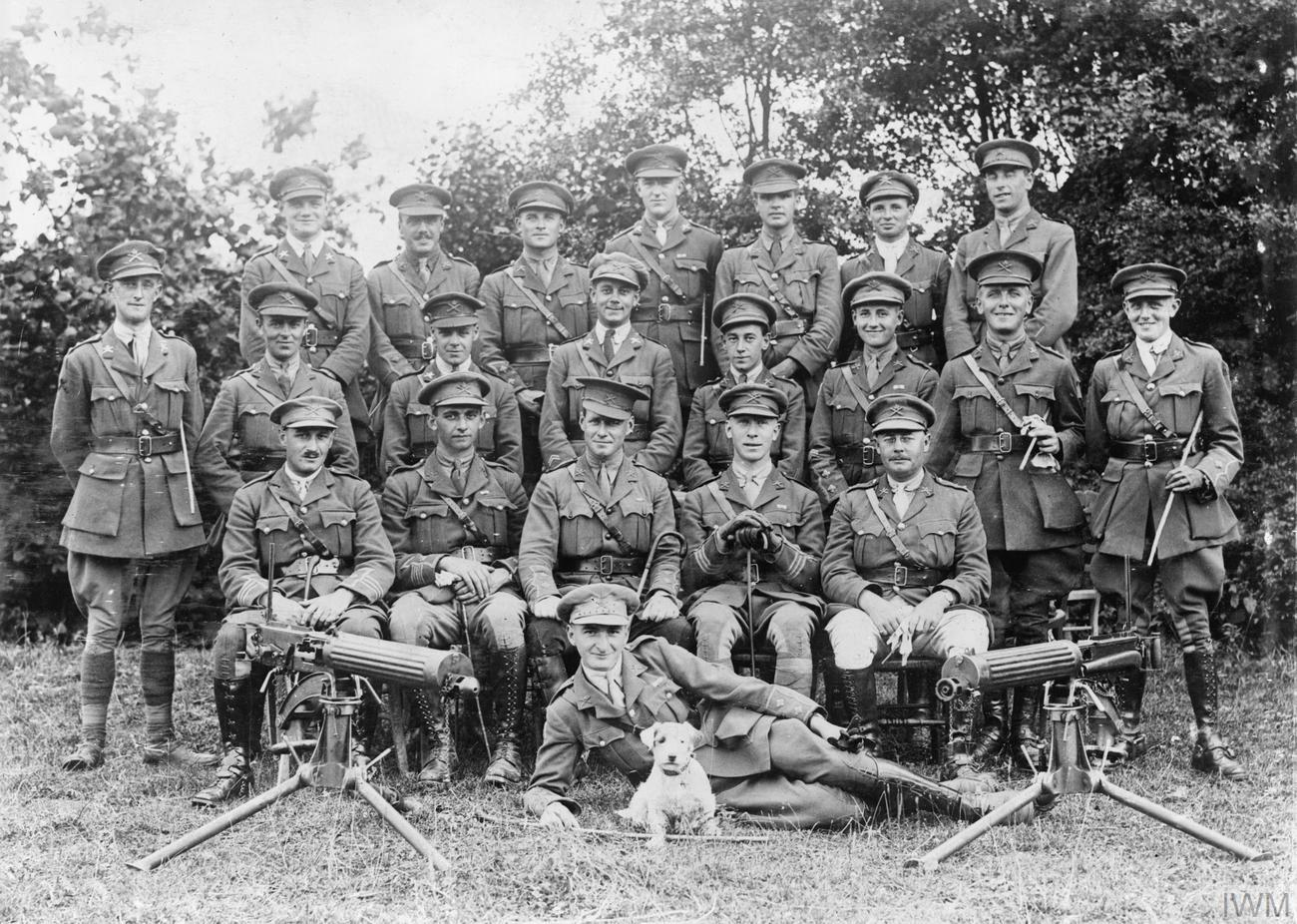
Group of officers of the 39th Battalion, Machine Gun Corps, including the Commanding Officer (seated, third from the left), Rombly, 20 July 1918.

This conviction may explain–from both sides–the persistence with which machine gunners were placed in exposed positions where their fire was only marginally effective but enemy troops could be seen to fall victim to it, using it sort of like a scare tactic, and the tenacity with which those same men fought using the machine gunswhen the same enemy concentrated their forces against the greater threat represented by an unstable sandbag emplacement.

As stated by Paul Cornish in Machine Guns and the Great War:

"The theory behind this technique had long been understood... as early as 1908... the mathematical work required to provide a reliable basis for the conduct of such fire was carried out by a group of British enthusiasts at the Hythe musketry school... However, it was 1915 before such fire was successfully carried out in the field..."

Cornish goes on "To conduct such fire the proposed target would be located... the relative position of the machine gun relative to it would be determined with ruler and protractor.. calculations would be made to determine the gun's potential cone of fire and the trajectory of its bullets (an important consideration if firing over the head of friendly troops). A clinometer, combined with a graduated elevation dial fitted to the tripod would be employed to set the gun to the correct elevation..."

The obvious complexities and the exacting preparations - in effect identical to those of artillery gunners - may have seemed arcane and pointless to those who carried - or whose men carried - rifles firing the same ammunition but could neither see (or more importantly imagine) the terminal effect of a long-range barrage.

When properly employed it was unarguably a devastating deterrent, as witnessed by those who took the trouble to seek out the areas interdicted but for those who took the trouble to do so were often regarded uncritical advocates of novel, untried tactics.

While in the more sustained direct fire role, properly supported: The 100th Company of the Machine Gun Corps at High Wood on 24 August 1916 was ordered to "give sustained covering fire for 12 hours onto a selected area 2000 yards away in order to prevent German troops forming up there for a counter-attack while a British attack was in progress" The ten machine guns of the company used 100 new barrels and "every drop of water in the neighbourhood, including the men's drinking water and contents of the latrine buckets, went up in steam to keep the guns cool" . And in that 12-hour period the ten guns fired a million rounds..."

Towards the end of the Great War some if not all deeply-entrenched attitudes were changing, and not only on the part of British and Commonwealth personnel. Following the extensive barrage fire at Vimy Ridge and Battle of Messines a demonstration was held on the dunes at Camiers by request of Field Marshal Sir Douglas Haig, Commander-in-Chief (C-in-C) of the British Expeditionary Force on the Western Front, who insisted all his Corps commanders attend.

French observers were treated to a similar demonstration, after which the concept was swiftly introduced into the French Army where it was embraced as a means to economise on artillery shells with the extraordinary assertion the results were more demoralising 'by means of continuity' than the result of shelling. Subsequently a machine gun school was established near the site of both demonstrations and machine gun barrages were successfully employed by the French forces at Meuse and Verdun.

== Post war ==
At the end of hostilities, the MGC was re-organised in a smaller form as many of its soldiers returned to civilian life. However, the Corps continued to see active service notably in the Russian Civil War; the Third Anglo-Afghan War, and the ongoing conflict in the Northwest Frontier of India.

The MGC also served prominently in the British force that occupied parts of Germany in the period between the Armistice of 1918 and the Versailles Peace Treaty of 1919 as its equipment and training made it possible for a relatively small garrison to control a large population but by 1920 the headquarters in Belton Park was closed and the War Office began to dispose of the many buildings.

In 1922 the Machine Gun Corps was disbanded as a cost-cutting measure.

== Victoria Crosses ==
The following members of the Machine Gun Corps have been awarded the Victoria Cross (VC), the highest and most prestigious award for valour in the face of the enemy that can be awarded to British and Commonwealth forces.

- Harold Sandford Mugford, April 11th 1917 at Monchy-le-Preux, France
- John Reginald Noble Graham, April 22nd 1917 at Istabulat, Mesopotamia
- Allan Ebenezer Ker, March 21st 1918 near Saint-Quentin, France
- Herbert George Columbine, March 22nd 1918 at Hervilly Wood, France
- Arthur Henry Cross, March 25th 1918 at Ervillers, France
- William Allison White, September 18th 1918 at Gouzeaucourt, France
- David Stuart McGregor, October 22nd 1918 near Hoogemolen, Belgium

== Machine Gun Corps Memorial, London ==
A memorial to the 15,552 wartime fatalities of the Machine Gun Corps was unveiled on 10 May 1925 by the Duke of Connaught, at Hyde Park Corner in London. It features a bronze statue by Francis Derwent Wood in the Renaissance style, depicting the youthful David after his defeat of the giant Goliath, an event described in the Book of Samuel; on lower plinths flanking the figure are two bronze models of Vickers machine guns, wreathed in laurels.

A short service of remembrance known as the Annual Observance is held on the second Saturday in May at the Memorial, which is organised by the Machine Gun Corps Old Comrades' Association. On Remembrance Sunday, the second Sunday in November, there is also a wreath laying ceremony held in conjunction with the ceremony at the nearby Royal Artillery Memorial.

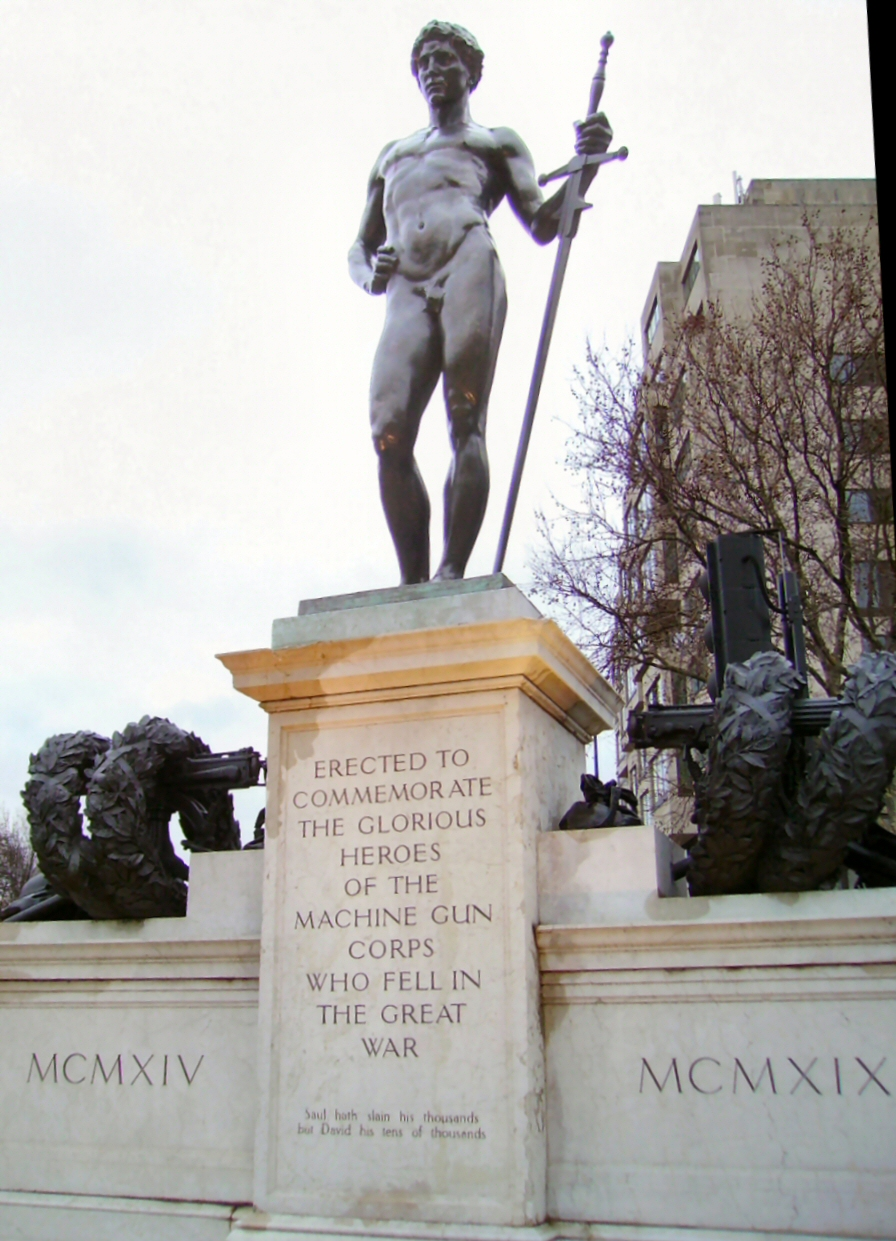
The "Boy David" Memorial to the Machine Gun Corps in London.

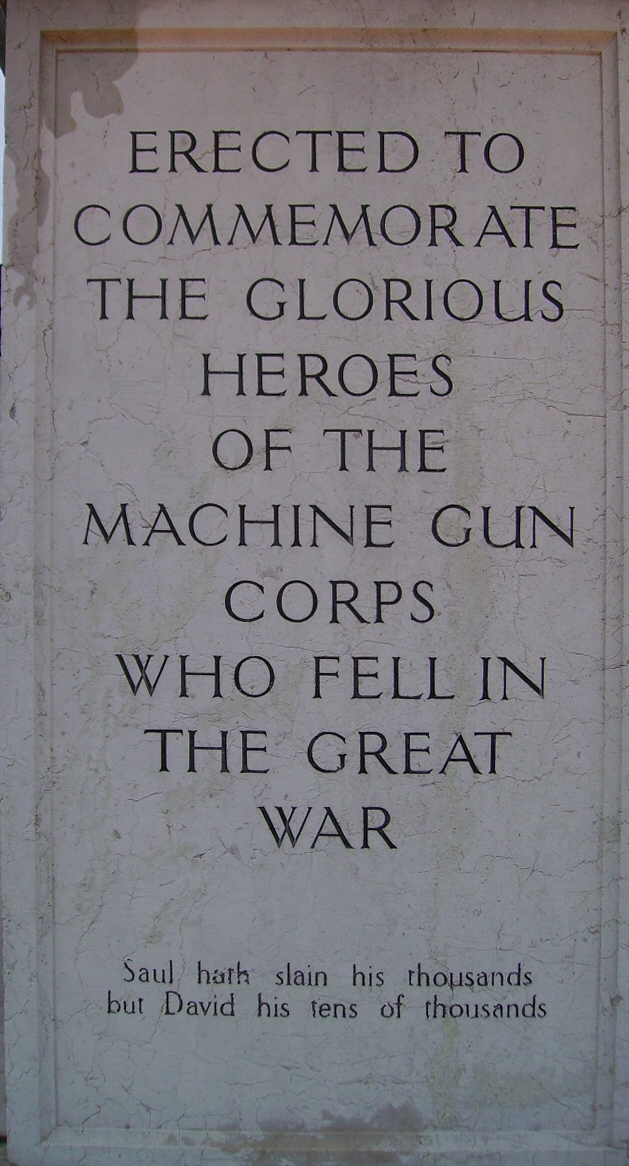
The inscription on the memorial: "Saul hath slain his thousands but David his tens of thousands" from 1 Samuel: chapter 18, verse 7.

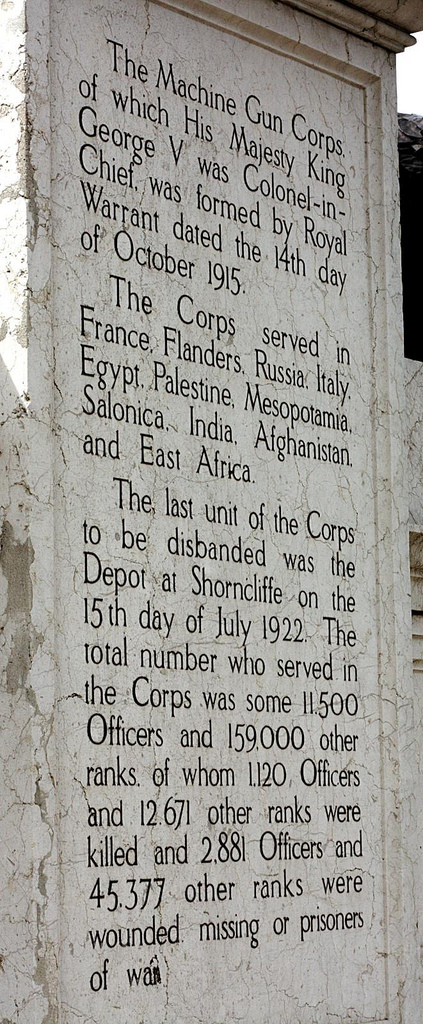
The inscription on rear of the memorial.

== Notable personnel ==
- Category:Machine Gun Corps soldiers
- Category:Machine Gun Corps officers

== Bibliography ==
- Coppard, George, With a Machine Gun to Cambrai. Cassell Military Paperbacks, 1999.
- Cornish, Paul, Machine Guns and the Great War. Pen & Sword Ltd 2009 ISBN 978-1-84884-047-8
- Corrigan, Gordon (2012) [2003]. Mud, Blood & Poppycock. Cassell Military Paperback. Cassell. ISBN 978-0-3043-6659-0.
- Crutchley, C. E., Machine Gunner: 1914–1918. Purnell Book Services, 1975.
- Weapons & War Machines - Ian V. Hogg & John Batchelor - Pheobus - 1976 ISBN 0-7026-0008-3
- Hutchison, G. S., Machine Guns: Their History and Tactical Employment (Being also a History of the Machine Gun Corps, 1916–1922). London: Macmillan, 1938.
- Russell, Arthur, With the Machine Gun Corps from Grantham to Cologne. London : Dranes, 1923.
- Stevens, F. A., The Machine Gun Corps: A Short History. Tonbridge: F. A. Stevens, 1981.
- MGC Old Comrades Association
- Time Team Series 20 Episode 01 The Forgotten Gunners of WWI
