= Pozières =

- Commune
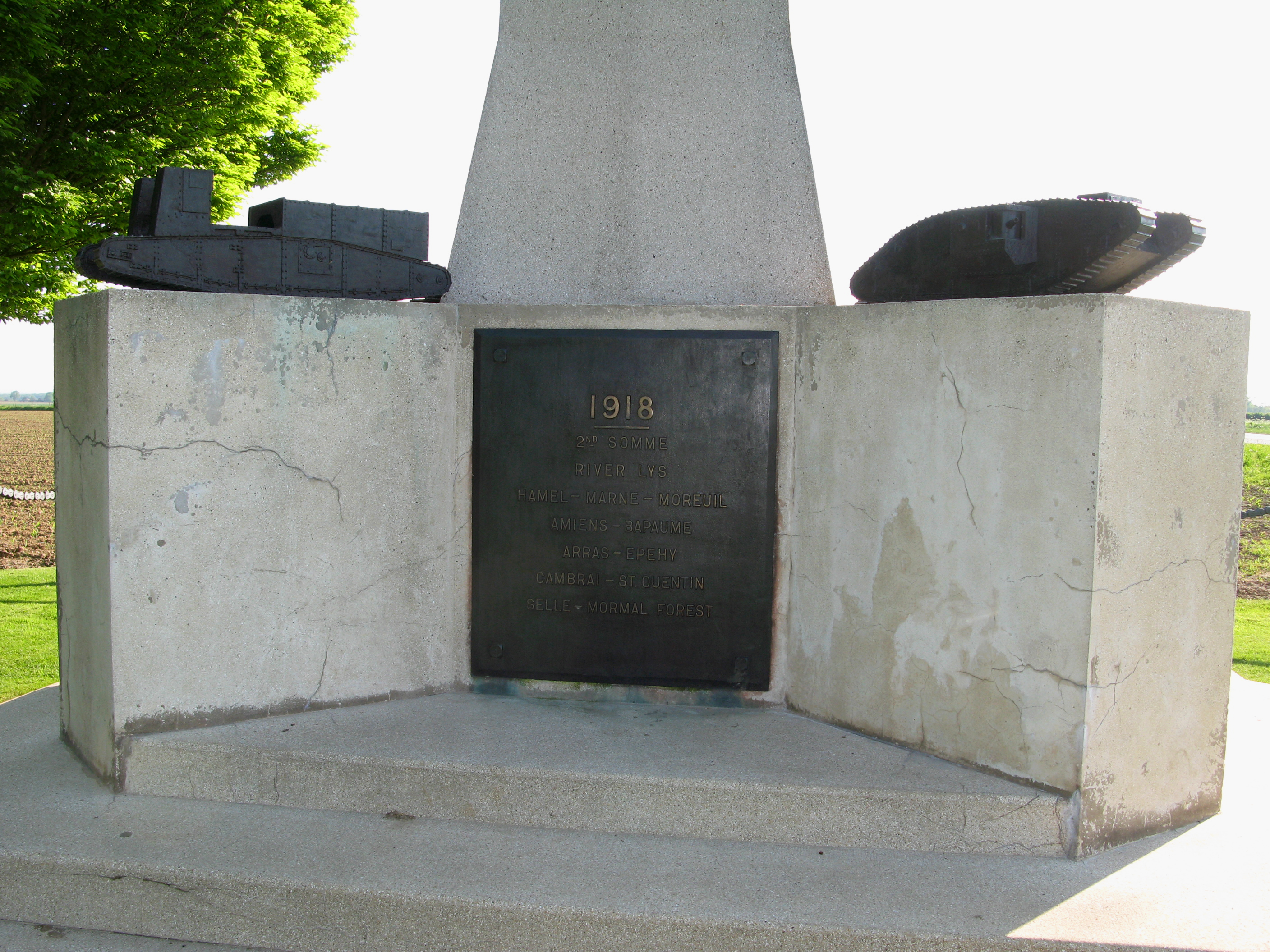
- The tank monument in Pozières
- Location of Pozières
- Location within France Location within Hauts-de-France
- Coordinates: 50°02′24″N 02°43′30″E
- Country: France
- Region: Hauts-de-France
- Department: Somme
- Arrondissement: Péronne
- Canton: Albert
- Intercommunality: Pays du Coquelicot

Government
  - Mayor (2020–2026): Dominique Bierwald
- Area^{1}: 3.24 km^{2} (1.25 sq mi)
- Elevation: 163 m (535 ft)
- Highest elevation: 161 m (528 ft)
- Lowest elevation: 115 m (377 ft)
- Population (2023): 263
  - Density: 81.2/km^{2} (210/sq mi)
- Time zone: UTC+01:00 (CET)
  - Summer (DST): UTC+02:00 (CEST)
- INSEE/Postal code: 80640 /80300
- ^{1} French Land Register data, which excludes lakes, ponds, glaciers > 1 km^{2} (0.386 sq mi or 247 acres) and river estuaries.

Pozières ([pɔz.jɛːʁ]; Picard: Pozière) is a commune in the Somme department in Hauts-de-France in northern France.

== Geography ==
The commune is situated on the D929 road, 34 kilometres (21 mi) northeast of Amiens between Albert and Bapaume, on the Pozières ridge.

Southwest of the village on Departmental Road 929 is the Pozières Memorial and Pozières British Cemetery. A total of 14,720 men, mostly Australians, are buried in the cemetery. Unidentified dead number 1,380. The memorial was dedicated in August 1930.

== Population ==
Historical population
Year	Pop.	±% p.a.
1968	281	—
1975	254	−1.43%
1982	279	+1.35%
1990	276	−0.14%
1999	244	−1.36%
2007	236	−0.42%
2012	255	+1.56%
2017	266	+0.85%
2023	263	−0.19%
Source: INSEE

== History ==
The village was completely destroyed in World War I during what became the Battle of Pozières (23 July – 7 August 1916), which was part of the Battle of the Somme. The village was subsequently rebuilt, and is now the site of several war memorials. The Australian flag flies over Pozières in recognition of the sacrifice of the ANZACs in the Battle of Pozières. Amongst the British and other Commonwealth forces who fought at Pozières, the Australians suffered over 5,000 killed, wounded or taken prisoner.

One of those killed, on 5 August, was the English composer George Butterworth, and in 2008 the road between the town and Martinpuich was renamed Chemin George Butterworth (George Butterworth Lane); 50.041172°N 2.733112°E).

== Gallery ==
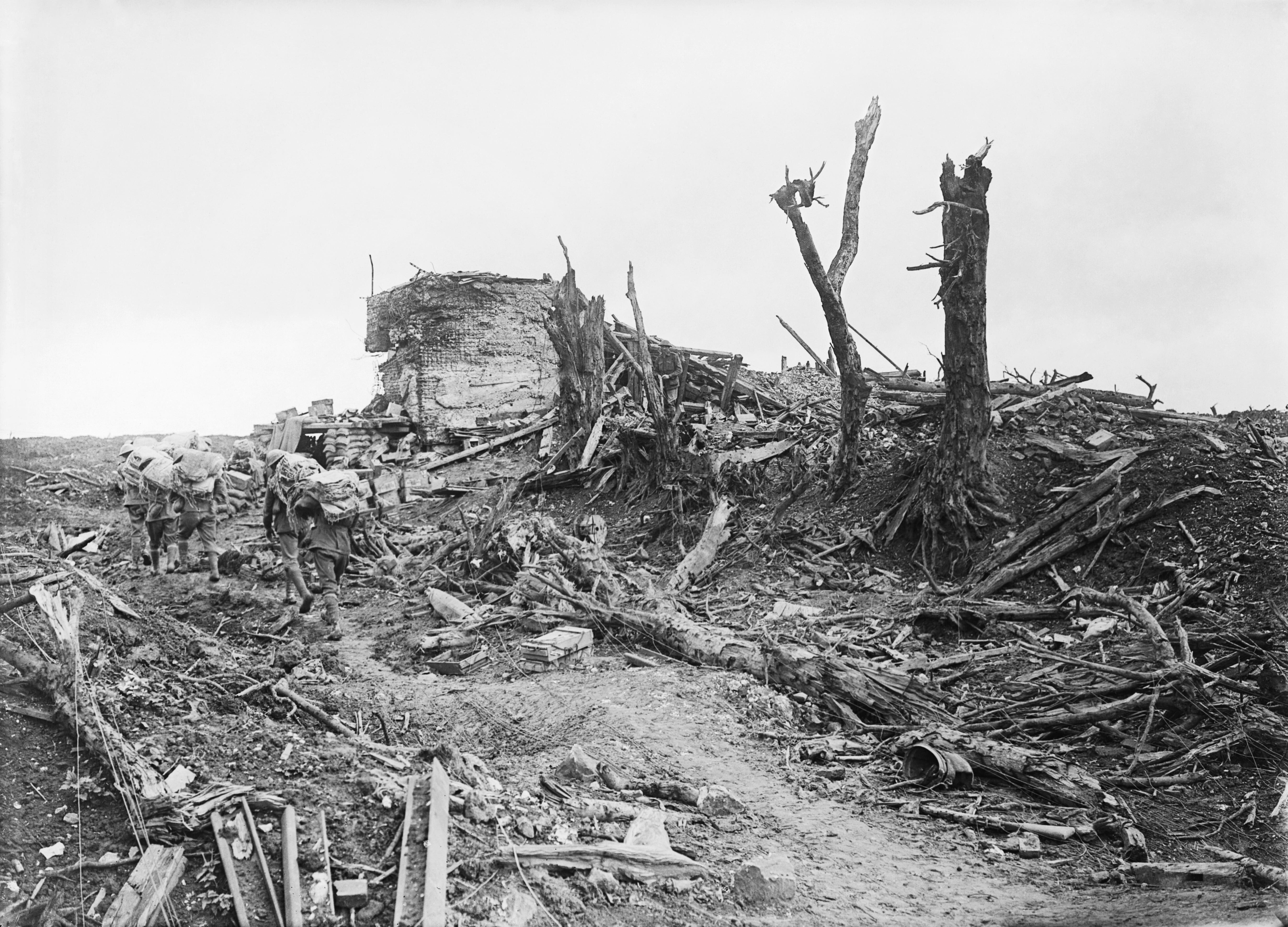
A fatigue party from the Australian 7th Brigade (Australian 2nd Division) pass the former German bunker known as "Gibraltar" at the western end of Pozières, 28 August 1916, during the Battle of the Somme. The infantry are laden with empty sandbags, heading towards the fighting around Mouquet Farm, north of Pozières.

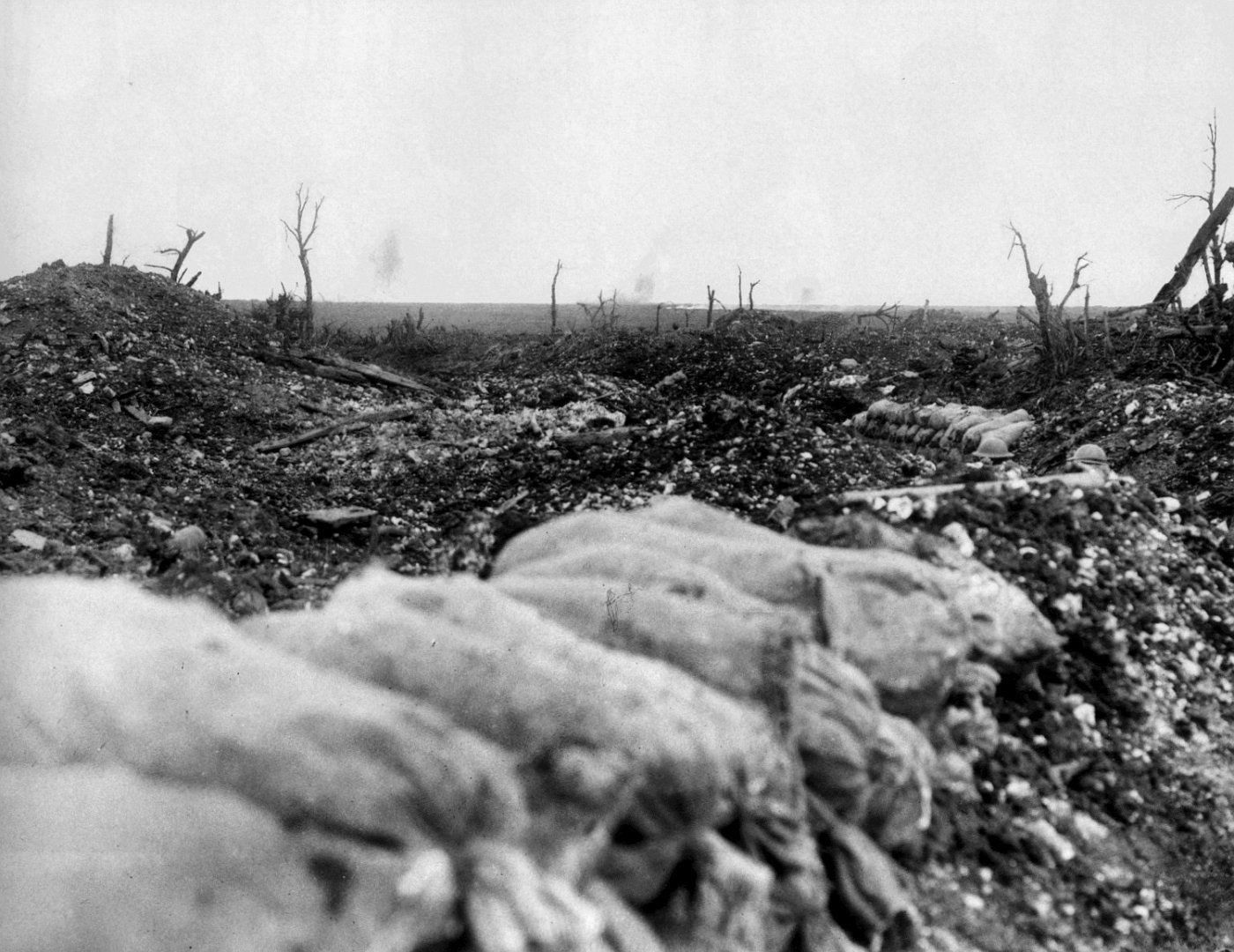
The view from Centre Way trench towards Mouquet Farm, August 1916

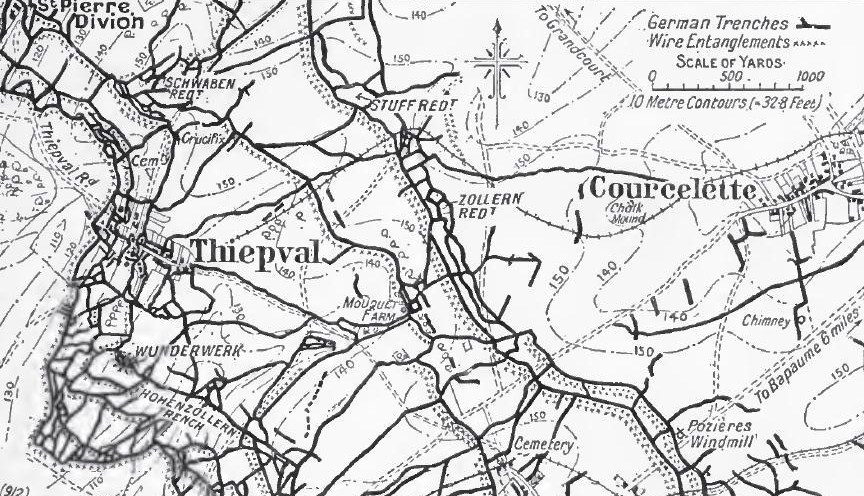
Map showing Mouquet Farm and the German defensive fortifications from Thiepval to Courcelette, July 1916

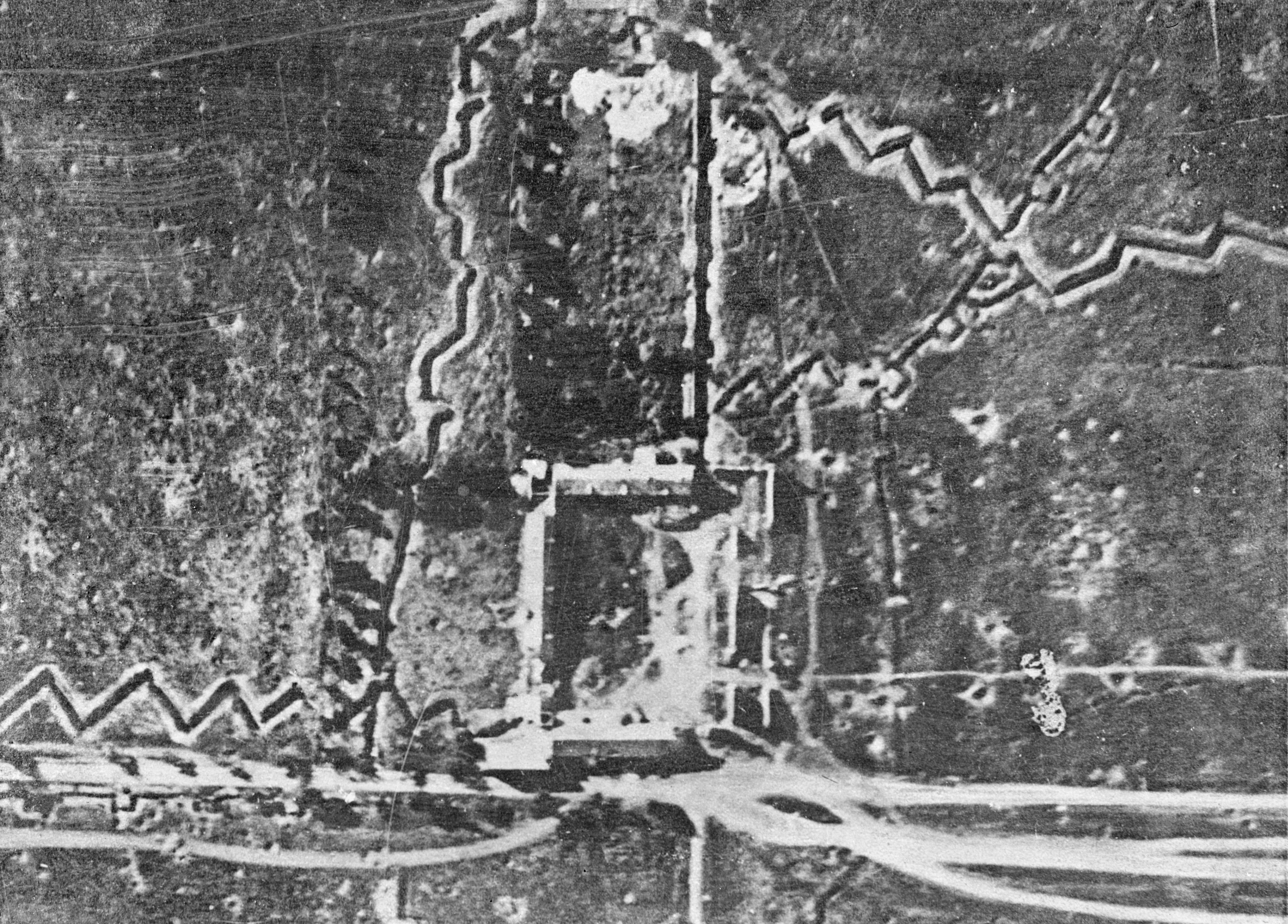
Mouquet Farm and its defences, June 1916 (Note: Ruins of farmhouse buildings are rectangular area at lower centre. Trench across top right is the western end of Fabeck Graben Trench at top left heading NNW is Zollern Redoubt. From lower centre a road not extant runs ENE to Courcelette; road at bottom heads SE towards Pozières; road running WSW at bottom left connects with Thiepval–Pozières road. The attacks were made from south to north, British on left and Australians centre and right)

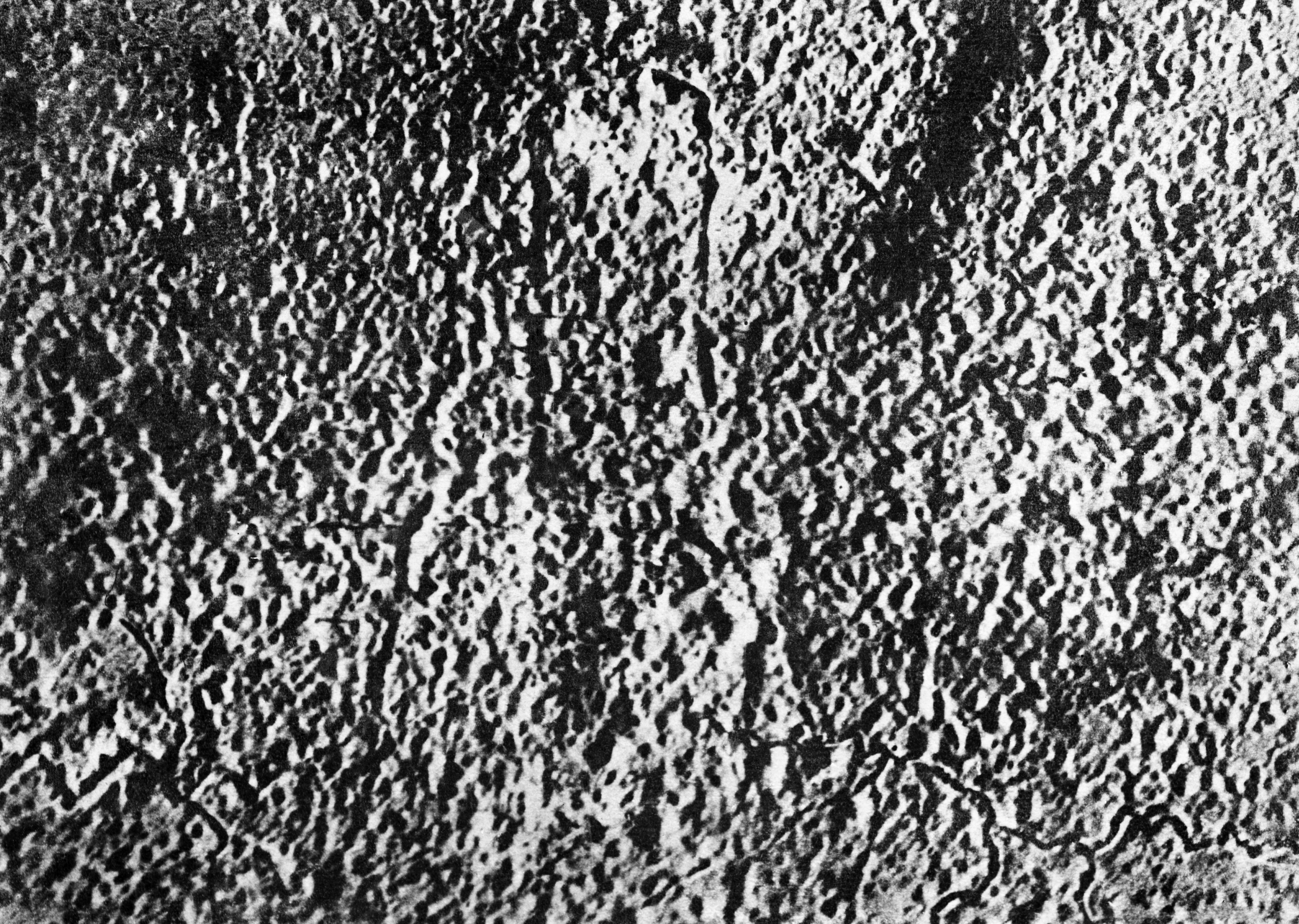
Mouquet Farm and its defences, September 1916 (Note: The farm building area is open land now and the rebuilt farm buildings are south of the road)

== See also ==
- Communes of the Somme department
