= Hervilly =

- Commune
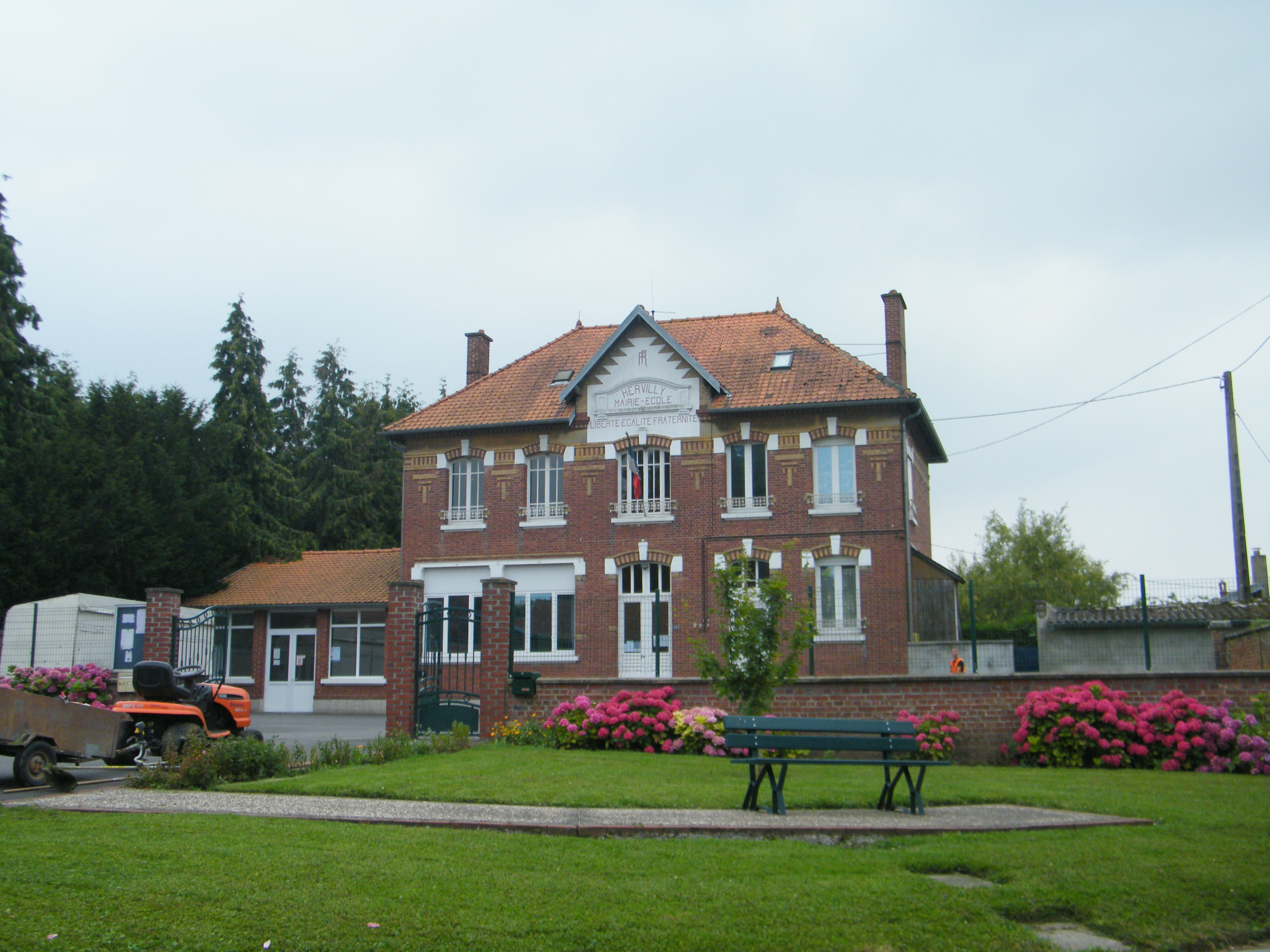
- The town hall and school in Hervilly
- Location of Hervilly
- Location within France Location within Hauts-de-France
- Coordinates: 49°56′12″N 3°07′01″E
- Country: France
- Region: Hauts-de-France
- Department: Somme
- Arrondissement: Péronne
- Canton: Péronne
- Intercommunality: Haute Somme

Government
  - Mayor (2020–2026): Gaëtan Dodré
- Area^{1}: 6.18 km^{2} (2.39 sq mi)
- Elevation: 75 m (246 ft)
- Highest elevation: 133 m (436 ft)
- Lowest elevation: 72 m (236 ft)
- Population (2023): 184
  - Density: 29.8/km^{2} (77.1/sq mi)
- Time zone: UTC+01:00 (CET)
  - Summer (DST): UTC+02:00 (CEST)
- INSEE/Postal code: 80434 /80240
- ^{1} French Land Register data, which excludes lakes, ponds, glaciers > 1 km^{2} (0.386 sq mi or 247 acres) and river estuaries.

Hervilly is a commune in the Somme department in Hauts-de-France in northern France.

== Geography ==
Hervilly is situated on the D24 road, some 13 miles (21 km) northwest of Saint-Quentin.

== Population ==
Historical population
Year	Pop.	±% p.a.
1968	174	—
1975	165	−0.76%
1982	184	+1.57%
1990	197	+0.86%
1999	204	+0.39%
2007	189	−0.95%
2012	165	−2.68%
2017	189	+2.75%
2023	184	−0.45%
Source: INSEE

== See also ==
- Communes of the Somme department
