= Hobart Cenotaph =

Military monument for Tasmania, Australia

- Australia
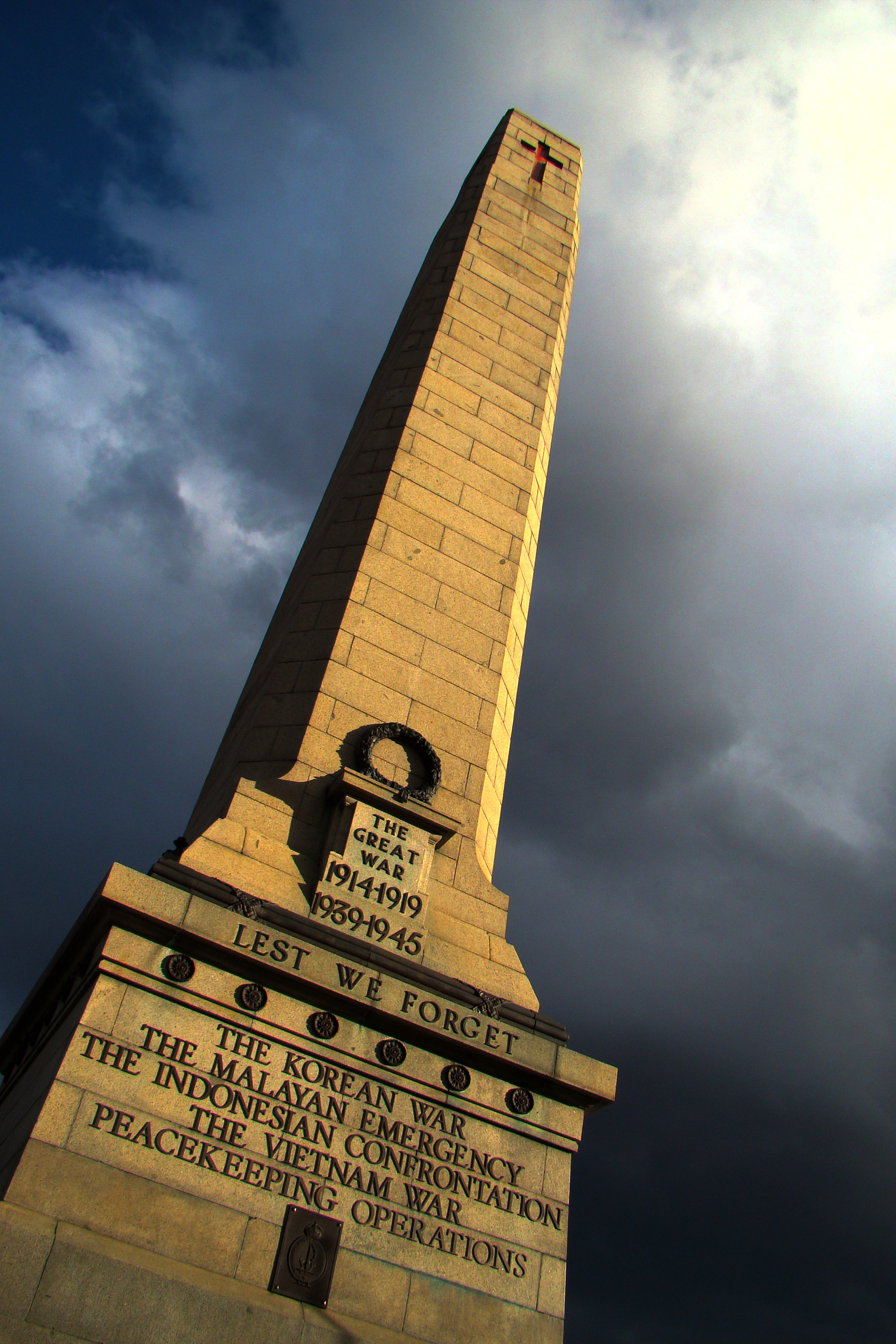
- For Tasmanians who served in wars and peacekeeping operations since 1914
- Unveiled: 13 December 1925
- Location: 42°52′39″S 147°20′10″E near Hobart, Australia
- Designed by: Hutchinson & Walker architects
- "Lest We Forget", "1914–1919" & "1939–45"

Hobart Cenotaph (usually The Cenotaph, also referred to as Hobart War Memorial) is the main commemorative military monument for the Australian state of Tasmania. It is located in the capital Hobart in a prominent position on the Queens Domain, on a small rise overlooking the city and River Derwent. The Cenotaph sits directly above what was once the location of the Queens Battery.

The Cenotaph is the centre of Anzac Day commemoration services at dawn and mid-morning, and is the destination of the marching procession. On Anzac Day at the break of dawn, a lone bugler always plays the Last Post.

== History ==
The Hobart Cenotaph is an Art Deco reinterpretation of a traditional Egyptian obelisk. The Cenotaph was originally erected to commemorate the war dead of Tasmania from World War I, but has had subsequent additions made for all conflicts since then in which Tasmanian soldiers have served. The original inscription reads: "Lest We Forget", and "1914–1919". Although World War I ended on 11 November 1918, the inscription is dated '1919' in commemoration of the Treaty of Versailles which was signed on 28 June 1919. There are no names recorded upon the Cenotaph itself.

An Anzac Day commemoration was held there in 1925 during construction. During the ceremony, a casket of solid zinc which bore the names of the 522 Tasmanians who were killed in World War I was set into the base of the shaft. It was unveiled on 13 December 1925 and replaced a previous wooden structure.

== Design ==
The monument was designed by Hobart architectural firm Hutchinson and Walker, after their entry had won a public competition held in 1923 for the structure's design. Their original design was for an obelisk that was to stand 65 feet (20 m) high, but it was decided to increase the height to 75 feet (23 m) in order that a cross be placed on top. The obelisk itself stands upon a stepped plinth 8 square metres (86 sq ft) made from bluestone, and the obelisk is made from grey granite. The shaft of the obelisk is tapered with chamfered edges and is capped with a pyramidal cap. Directly beneath the cap on each side are back-lit red opaque glass Latin crosses that are illuminated constantly in remembrance of the dead.

Other features of the original design are a bronze laurel wreath on the north face, bronze fluted panels on each face of the plinth, six rosettes on each side of the Obelisk base, and groups of three flag holders on the north, east and west faces of plinth. On each of the four faces are the crests of the four service organisations – the Royal Australian Air Force, Royal Australian Navy, Australian Commonwealth Military Forces and the Royal Australian Army Nursing Corps (which was added in 1991). Floodlights on each corner illuminate the shaft of the Obelisk at night.

The site of the Hobart Cenotaph was deliberately chosen for its prominence. Not only is it a location with its own military legacy, having been the site of the Queens Battery from 1838 until 1923, but the site also has excellent views of the city, Mount Wellington and the Derwent River. Following the completion of the Cenotaph, the site was landscaped extensively with a paved avenue lined with Poplar trees, and named "Anzac Parade", leading from the Tasman Highway to the Cenotaph.

== Additions ==
The Hobart Cenotaph was originally designed as a memorial to the Tasmanians who died serving their country in World War I. However it was later decided that the Cenotaph would be altered to commemorate those who had died in subsequent conflicts as well.

The first addition was for soldiers who were killed in World War II, and was placed directly below the "1914–1919" inscription, and simply reads:"1939-45". Subsequent inscriptions memorialising Tasmanian war dead in more recent conflicts on the face of the plinth below those of the two world wars are: "The Korean War", "The Malayan Emergency", "The Indonesian Confrontation", "The Vietnam War", and "Peace-Keeping Operations".

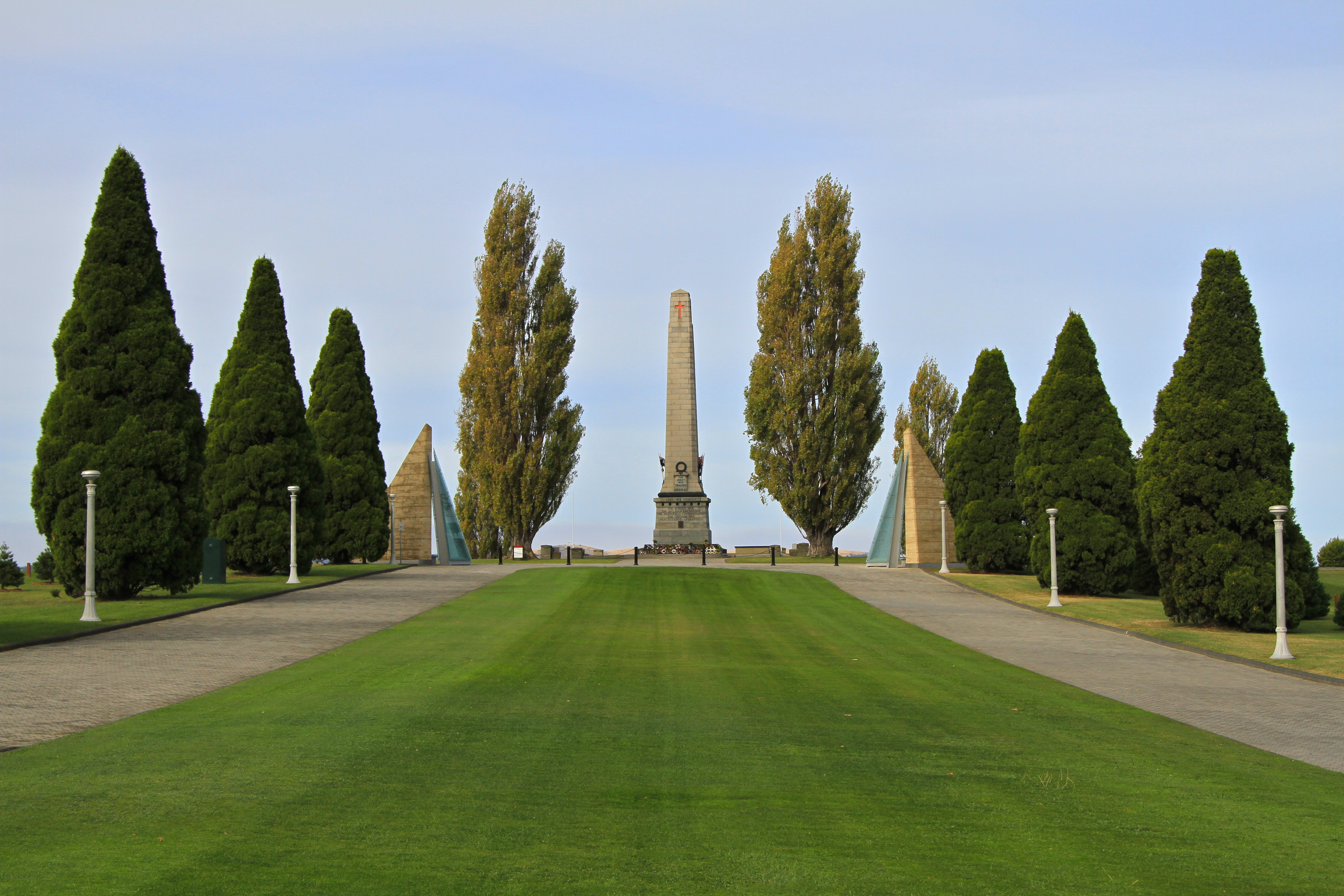
Hobart cenotaph and War Memorial, looking along ANZAC Parade / McVilly Drive. 52 trees now surround the Cenotaph and line the avenue: Cupressus torulosa, Sequoiadendron, Populus nigra 'Italica' and Quercus ilex.

== Victoria Cross Memorial ==
In 2003, two earthen walls were erected either side of Anzac Parade slightly to the north of the Cenotaph, with soil from the birthplace of all of Tasmania's thirteen Victoria Cross recipients, as well as soil from the battlefield where they earned their VC. It also tells the story behind each VC recipient.

The Tasmanian recipients of the Victoria Cross are:

- Second Boer War – Trooper John Hutton Bisdee, Lieutenant Guy George Egerton Wylly
- World War I – Corporal Walter Ernest Brown, Captain Percy Herbert Cherry, Sergeant John James Dwyer, Lieutenant Alfred Edward Gaby, Lance Corporal Bernard Sidney Gordon, Sergeant Stanley Robert McDougall, Captain James Ernest Newland, Sergeant Lewis McGee, Captain Henry William Murray, Sergeant Percy Clyde Statton, Sergeant John Woods Whittle

== Soldier's Memorial Avenue ==
The Soldier's Memorial Avenue upon the Queens Domain was a memorial that pre-dated the construction of the Cenotaph itself. The Avenue was first proposed in late 1917 with a decision to proceed in 1918. The groundwork was undertaken in June and July 1918 with the first dedication of trees on 3 August 1918. A crowd estimated at between eight and ten thousand attended the ceremony. A mark of its importance can be seen in the fact that Hobart's population was a mere 29,000 at the time. The event was extensively covered in the Hobart Mercury, the Tasmanian Mail and the Weekly Courier. A special commemorative pin back badge was produced together with an extensive souvenir program.

The planting was a joint effort of the Hobart City Council, as custodians of the land, and the RSSILA. The New Town Council also joined the enterprise. Nearly 390 trees were planted in the first stage. A second planting took place on 15 February 1919 with a further 110 trees planted. More trees seem to have been dedicated in the months following.

The trees planted were cedars of 3 varieties – Himalayan cedar, Atlas cedar and Blue Atlas. The reason for the choice is not clear though its religious connotations and reputation for longevity were commented upon at the time.

Trees were originally marked by wooden name boards, sheathed in zinc and painted with car duco. These were replaced in the early 1930s by zinc name plates suspended on the trees. A combination of vandalism and natural aging (most likely rusting of the chains) meant that by the 1980s more than half has disappeared – most of those remaining were removed.

The restoration of the Avenue, begun in 2002 by Friends of Soldiers Walk (now Friends of Soldiers Memorial Avenue) and the Hobart City Council has seen over 480 bronze plaques placed at trees along the Avenue. These are mounted on concrete plinths and carry details of full name, unit, place and date of death, age, occupation and a range of other information about family, military career and civilian life.

The discussions about the intended Hobart war memorial were underpinned by the existence of the Avenue with a resolution passed by the War Memorial Committee that any war memorial should be adjacent to the Avenue. The original intent was to place that memorial on the Domain proper. When the old Queens Battery site became available, the new memorial (the Cenotaph) was placed there. In 1926 a double row of cedars was planted on the city side of the area to connect the Cenotaph to the Avenue – this was known as the Soldiers Memorial Avenue extension. By 2000, only two of those trees remained to the west of the Cenotaph.

== See also ==
- Cenotaph
