= John Whittle =

Australian recipient of the VC (1882–1946)

John Woods Whittle VC, DCM
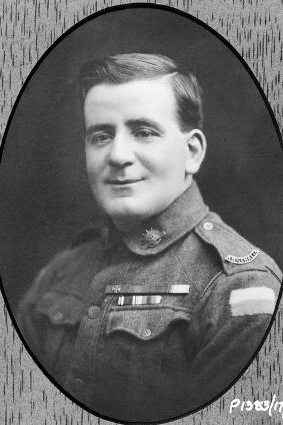
- Sergeant John Whittle c.1919
- Born: 3 August 1882; Huon Island, Tasmania
- Died: 2 March 1946 (aged 63); Glebe, New South Wales
- Burial place: Rookwood Cemetery, Sydney
- Military career
- Allegiance: Australia; United Kingdom
- Branch: Australian Army; Royal Navy
- Service years: 1899–1918; 1921; 1930
- Rank: Sergeant
- Conflicts: Second Boer War; First World War; Western Front; Battle of the Somme; Battle of Pozières; Battle of Arras; Battle of Passchendaele; German spring offensive
- Awards: Victoria Cross; Distinguished Conduct Medal

John Woods Whittle, VC, DCM (3 August 1882 – 2 March 1946) was an Australian sailor, soldier and a recipient of the Victoria Cross, the highest decoration for gallantry "in the face of the enemy" that can be awarded to members of the British and British Commonwealth armed forces. Whittle was serving as a sergeant in the First World War when he was decorated with the Victoria Cross following two separate actions against German forces during their retreat to the Hindenburg Line in 1917. In the latter action, he attacked a machine gun crew, killing the group and seizing the gun.

Born in Tasmania, Whittle completed twelve months active service during the Second Boer War, before returning to Australia and enlisting in the Royal Navy, where he served for five years as a stoker. Re-enlisting in the army, he was posted to the Army Service Corps, artillery, and Tasmanian Rifle Regiment before the outbreak of the First World War. Transferring to the Australian Imperial Force in 1915, Whittle joined the 12th Battalion in Egypt and embarked for the Western Front the following year. During an attack on the village of La Barque, Whittle rushed a German trench and forced the men from the position; he was awarded the Distinguished Conduct Medal as a result.

Wounded three times during the war, Whittle was the subject of two courts-martial for unruly behaviour. In October 1918, he returned to Australia at the invitation of the Prime Minister of Australia to assist in recruitment. Discharged from the military in December 1918, he later moved to Sydney. In 1934, Whittle was presented with a Certificate of Merit after saving a drowning boy. He died in 1946, aged 63.

== Early life ==
Whittle was born on 2 August 1882 at Huon Island, Tasmania, to Henry Whittle, a labourer, and his wife Catherine (née Sullivan). He grew up in Hobart, and was living there when he enlisted as a private in the 4th Tasmanian (2nd Imperial Bushman) Contingent during 1899, for service in the Second Boer War. The unit embarked for South Africa on 27 March 1901, and arrived four weeks later. The contingent spent the following twelve months on active duty, which included action in the Cape Colony, before returning to Australia on 25 June 1902.

Soon after his return to Australia, Whittle enlisted in the Royal Navy as a stoker. He spent five years as a sailor, during which time he was attached to several ships on the Australia Station, including HMS Challenger and HMAS Pioneer. Discharged from the navy in 1907, Whittle joined the Australian Army and was posted to the Army Service Corps; he was to serve in this position for three and a half years. During this time, Whittle married Emily Margaret Roland in a Catholic ceremony at the archbishop's house, Hobart, on 23 July 1909.

Following his marriage, Whittle transferred briefly to the artillery, serving with the 31st Battery, Australian Field Artillery. He was then posted to the Tasmanian Rifle Regiment, and remained with this unit until the outbreak of the First World War.

== First World War ==
=== Early war service ===
On 6 August 1915, Whittle transferred to the Australian Imperial Force to see active service overseas during the war. Allotted as a reinforcement to the 26th Battalion as a private, he embarked from Melbourne on 27 October aboard HMAT Ulysses bound for Egypt. Appointed acting corporal soon after arrival, he was reallocated to the 12th Battalion with the rank of private on 1 March 1916, following a period of divisional reorganisation and expansion to the Australian forces which were now stationed in Egypt. Whittle was promoted to the substantive rank of corporal two weeks later.

Embarking for the Western Front, the 12th Battalion joined the British Expeditionary Force upon arrival in France on 7 April 1916. Eight days later, Whittle was promoted to lance sergeant. Posted to the Fleurbaix sector of France, the 12th Battalion was engaged in minor operations until July. During this time, Whittle was wounded on 18 June, suffering a gunshot wound to his right arm. Initially admitted to the 3rd Field Ambulance, the injury necessitated treatment in England and Whittle was transferred to the 1st Auxiliary Hospital, Harefield. He rejoined the 12th Battalion on 16 September following recuperation.

Following its involvement at Pozières from July to September 1916, the 12th Battalion moved to the Ypres sector in Belgium, where Whittle was promoted to sergeant on 14 October. In late November, Whittle was admitted to hospital suffering from an illness; on 18 December, he rejoined his unit, which had returned to action on the Somme.

During the German retreat to the Hindenburg Line, Whittle took part in the 12th Battalion's attack on the villages of La Barque and Ligny-Thilloy as a member of Captain James Newland's A Company on 26–27 February 1917. At Bark Trench, a position on the north side of the centre of La Barque, the company encountered a German strongpoint and Newland was wounded. Rallying his men, Whittle rushed the post and started bombing the occupants with grenades. He then chased the Germans as they began to retreat down the trench line, before they were forced from the position. For his efforts during the assault, Whittle was awarded the Distinguished Conduct Medal, the recommendation of which cited his "... conspicuous gallantry in the presence of the enemy". The announcement of the award was published in a supplement to the London Gazette on 26 April 1917.

=== Victoria Cross ===
By early April 1917, three German-held outpost villages remained between the area to the south of the I Anzac Corps position and the Hindenburg Line. An attack to capture the villages of Boursies, Demicourt and Hermies by the 1st Australian Division was formulated to commence on 9 April, the day the British offensive opened at Arras. For his gallantry in two separate actions during this engagement, Whittle was awarded the Victoria Cross.

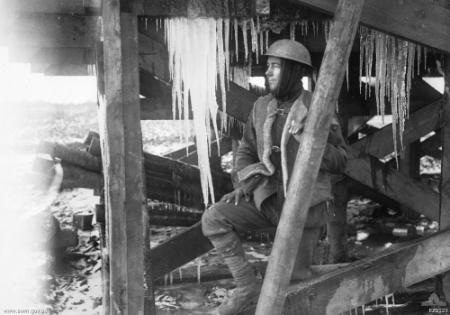
Sergeant J. W. Whittle in France, 1916

On 8 April, the 12th Battalion was tasked with the capture of the village of Boursies. The attack was to act as a feint to mislead the German forces on the direction from which Hermies was to be assaulted. Whittle had been placed in command of the left platoon in Newland's A Company for the attack, which commenced at 03:00. Advancing, the company was subjected to heavy machine gun fire from a derelict mill approximately 400 metres (440 yd) short of the village and began to suffer heavy casualties. Gathering a party of men, Newland led a bombing attack which was able to dislodge the Germans from the position and secure the area. Continuing their advance, the company was able to reach its objectives, where Whittle was placed in command of a post just beyond the mill.

Throughout the day, the Australians came under heavy shellfire from the Germans. At 22:00, the German forces launched a severe counter-attack against the mill under the cover of an intense barrage of artillery and bombs. Advancing down the main road, they managed to enter the trench Whittle was holding. Gathering all available men, Whittle charged the Germans and was able to restabilise the position. Newland arrived soon after, and the two men worked together until the position was re-established. The 12th Battalion was relieved on 10 April by the 11th Battalion, having succeeded in capturing Boursies at the cost of 240 casualties, of which 70 were killed or missing.

Following a four-day reprieve away from the frontline, the 12th Battalion relieved the 9th Battalion at Lagnicourt on 14 April. Around dawn the following day, the Germans launched a fierce counter-attack against the 1st Australian Division's line. Breaking through the Australian line, the Germans forced back the 12th Battalion's D Company, which was to the left of Newland's A Company. Soon surrounded and under attack on three sides, Newland withdrew the company to a sunken road which had been held by Captain Percy Cherry during the capture of the village three weeks earlier, and lined the depleted company out in a defensive position on both banks. Establishing his platoon in position, Whittle noticed a group of Germans moving a machine gun into position to enfilade the road. As the gunners began to set up the weapon, Whittle, under heavy rifle fire, jumped from the road and single-handedly rushed the crew. Using his bombs, he succeeded in killing the entire group before collecting the gun and taking it back to A Company's position.

As reinforcements from the 9th Battalion began to arrive, Newland was able to repulse a third attack by the Germans. Reorganising the 9th and 12th Battalions, a combined counter-attack was able to be launched and the line recaptured by approximately 11:00. The 12th Battalion had suffered 125 casualties during the engagement, including 66 killed or missing. Whittle and Newland were both subsequently awarded a Victoria Cross for their actions that day; the pair were the only two permanent members of the Australian military to receive the decoration during the war.

The full citation for Whittle's Victoria Cross appeared in a supplement to the London Gazette on 8 June 1917, reading:

War Office, 8th June, 1917.

His Majesty the KING has been graciously pleased to approve of the award of the Victoria Cross to the undermentioned Officers, Non-commissioned Officers and Men: —

No. 2902 Sjt. John Woods Whittle, Inf. Bn., Aus. Imp. Force.

For conspicuous bravery and devotion to duty on two occasions.

When in command of a platoon the enemy, under cover of an intense artillery barrage, attacked the small trench he was holding. Owing to weight of numbers the enemy succeeded in entering the trench, and it was owing to Sjt. Whittle personally collecting all available men and charging the enemy that the position was regained.

On a second occasion when the enemy broke through the left of our line Sjt. Whittle's own splendid example was the means of keeping the men well in hand. His platoon were suffering heavy casualties and the enemy endeavoured to bring up a machine gun to enfilade the position. Grasping the situation he rushed alone across the fire-swept ground and attacked the hostile gun crew with bombs before the gun could be got into action.

He succeeded in killing the whole crew and in bringing back the machine gun to our position.

=== Later war service ===
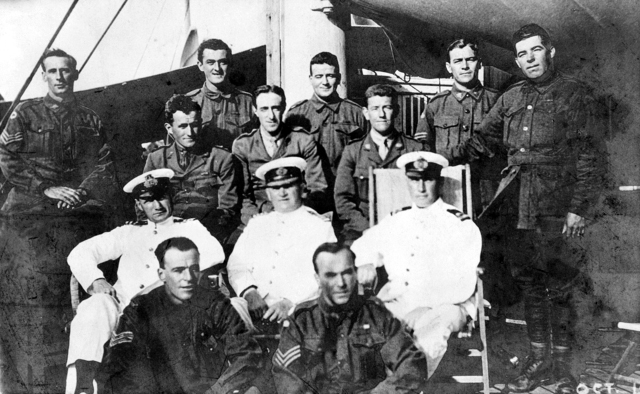
The group of ten Australian Victoria Cross recipients repatriated to Australia to assist in recruitment pictured on HMAT Medic with three naval officers. Whittle is in the centre of the back row.

In late April 1917, Whittle spent three days in a field hospital receiving treatment for psoriasis, before embarking for England on attachment to a training battalion. Joining the unit on 6 May, he once again underwent an eight-day furlough in a military hospital later in the month. During this time, Whittle attended an investiture ceremony in the forecourt of Buckingham Palace on 21 July, where he was decorated by King George V with his Victoria Cross and Distinguished Conduct Medal.

Re-embarking for France on 25 August, Whittle rejoined the 12th Battalion which had subsequently moved to Belgium in preparation for another offensive at Ypres. On 1 October, he was the subject of a General Court Martial in the field, charged with two offences committed on 27 September: 1. Drunkenness while on active service; 2. Conduct to the prejudice of good order and Military Discipline while on active service, in that when the commanding officer was addressing a parade he called out words to the effect of: "But we are good soldiers though". He was found guilty of both offences, and sentenced to be reduced to the rank of corporal. Following four days detention during the trial, Whittle re-joined the 12th Battalion on 8 October.

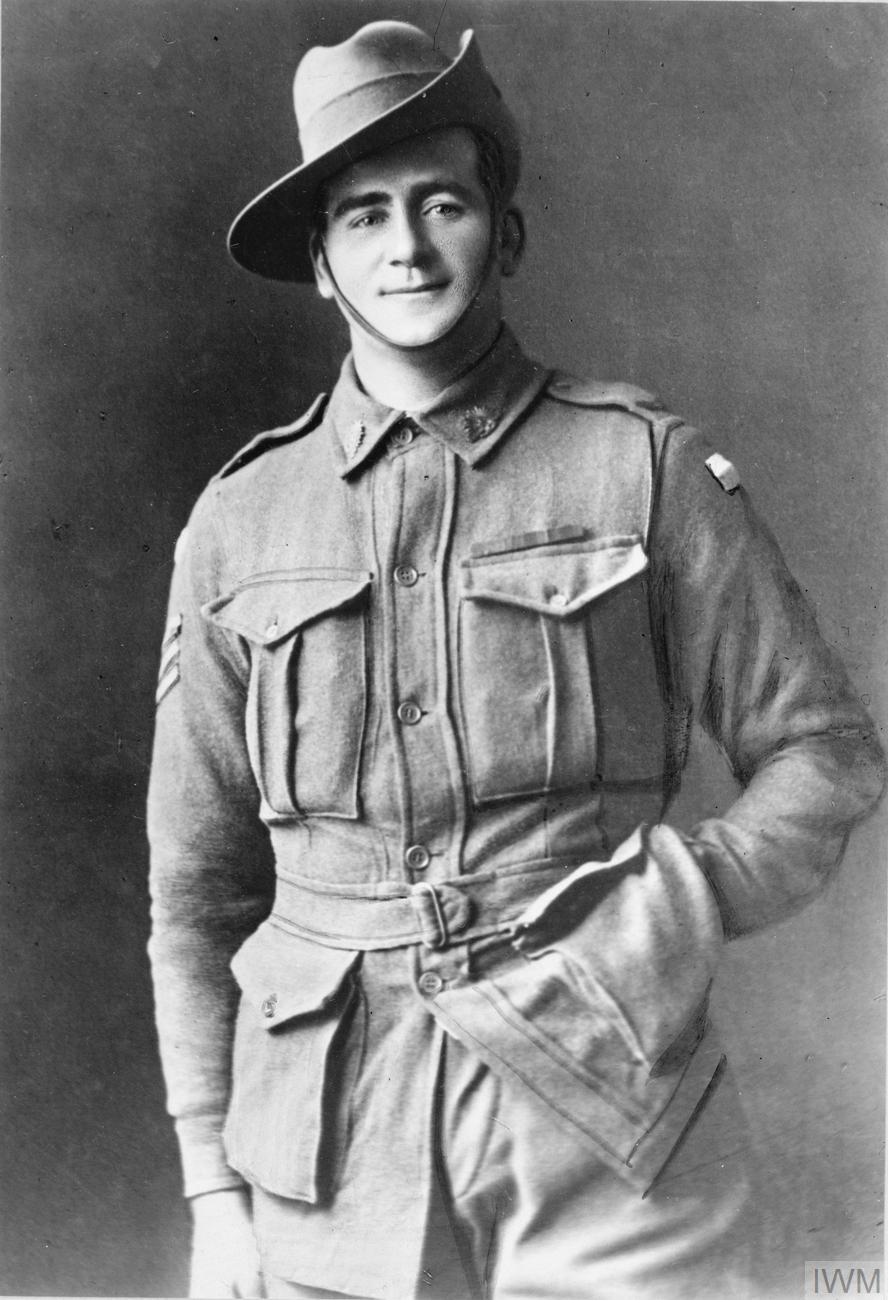
Sergeant John Whittle c. 1918

The 12th Battalion spent the next two months engaged in minor operations in Belgium, before once again transferring to the trenches in France during December. During this time, Whittle was re-promoted to the rank of sergeant. With the commencement of the German spring offensive of 1918, the 12th Battalion assisted in repulsing the assault in the months of March and April. While engaged in this operation, Whittle was wounded on 19 March and admitted to a field hospital suffering shrapnel wounds to his right hand. Recovering from the wound, he returned to the 12th Battalion in April. Later that month, Whittle was charged with conduct to the prejudice of good order and Military Discipline a second time for mutilating his pay book; he was reprimanded by the battalion's commanding officer as a result.

In June 1918, Whittle was posted to the 2nd Army Central School for a five-week stint. Returning to the 12th Battalion in mid-July, Whittle was wounded in action for the third time; suffering shrapnel wounds to his right elbow, he was admitted to the 3rd Australian Field Ambulance on 25 July. Evacuated to England, he was admitted to the Central Military Hospital, Eastbourne, before transferring to the 3rd Australian Auxiliary Hospital, Dartford, two weeks later. During this time, Billy Hughes, as Prime Minister of Australia, invited several of Australia's Victoria Cross recipients of the war to return to Australia and assist in a recruiting drive; Whittle was among a group of ten who accepted the offer. The party embarked aboard HMAT Medic on 24 August, bound for Melbourne. Arriving seven weeks later, Whittle returned to Tasmania and assisted with recruiting on the island during the last few weeks of the war. Following the Armistice, he was discharged from the Australian Imperial Force on 15 December 1918.

== Later life ==
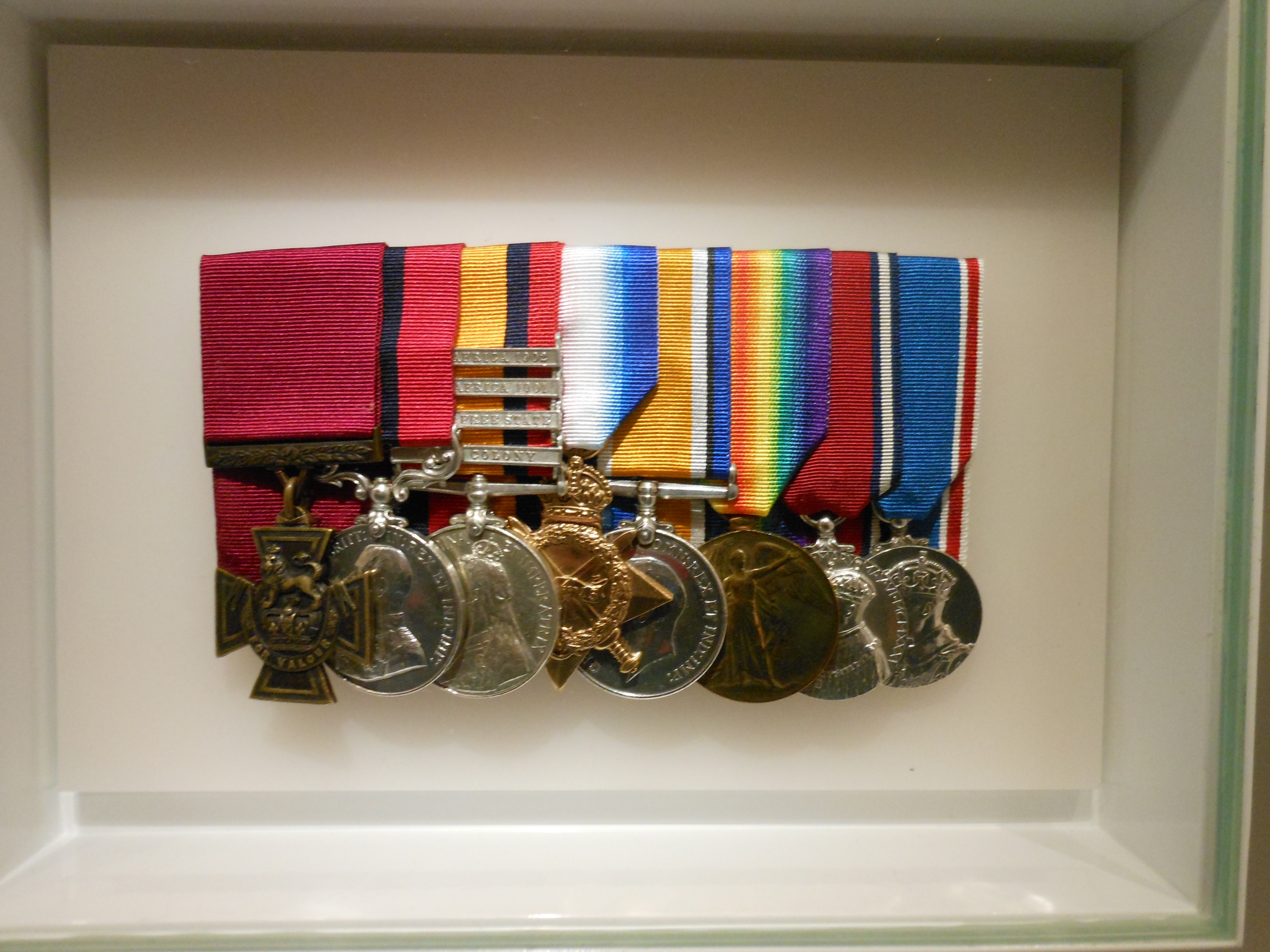
John Whittle's medals at the Australian War Memorial, Canberra.

After his discharge from the Australian Imperial Force, Whittle re-settled in Hobart with his family. He briefly re-enlisted in the 40th Battalion during 1921, before moving to Sydney, where he gained employment as an inspector on the staff of an insurance company. Whittle later worked in several other jobs, including a period of service with Tooth's Brewery in Sydney. On 11 November 1929, he attended the New South Wales Dinner for recipients of the Victoria Cross in Sydney, before briefly re-enlisting in the Australian Army once again the following year.

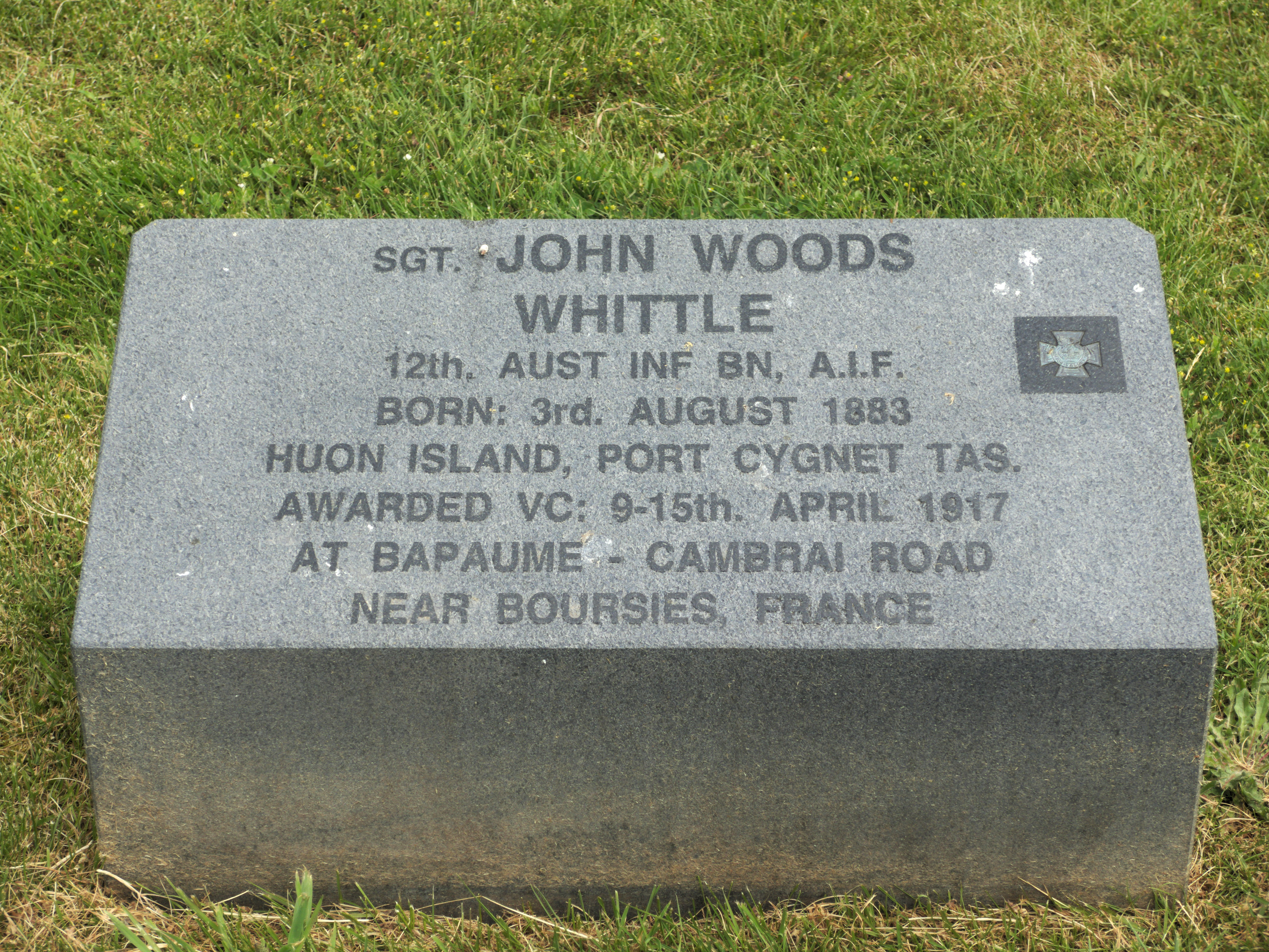
Memorial plaque in Cygnet, Tasmania

On 7 February 1934, Whittle was walking through University Park when he was accosted by a small boy who said that his younger brother had fallen into the lake. Rushing to the area, Whittle dived into the weed-choked lake and began searching for the boy. Finding him unconscious, Whittle brought the boy to the bank and applied artificial respiration for approximately half an hour; the child later came around and was taken to hospital. Whittle left the scene and proceeded home in a taxi without leaving his name, but his identity was subsequently discovered and he was presented with a Certificate of Merit by the Royal Life Saving Society. Whittle himself was ill for a fortnight due to swallowing some of the foul water in the ornamental lake.

During the Second World War, Whittle's son, Ivan Ernest, served as a private in the 2/33rd Australian Infantry Battalion. He was killed on 7 September 1943 when a B-24 Liberator bomber crashed into his battalion's marshalling yard at Port Moresby, New Guinea. Just over two years later, and aged 63, John Whittle died of a cerebral haemorrhage at his home in Glebe on 2 March 1946. Survived by his wife, second son and three daughters, he was buried in Rookwood Cemetery.
