= List of shipwrecks in May 1873 =

The list of shipwrecks in May 1873 includes ships sunk, foundered, grounded, or otherwise lost during May 1873.

== 1 May ==
List of shipwrecks: 1 May 1873
Ship	State	Description
Arrow	United Kingdom	The schooner foundered in the Atlantic Ocean. Her crew were rescued. She was on a voyage from Barbados to Boston.
Ganges	United Kingdom	The steamship ran aground in the Chesapeake River. She was on a voyage from Liverpool, Lancashire to Baltimore, Maryland.
Lorenzo Valero	Italy	The barque was driven ashore in the Cedar Inlet, United States.
Senegal	France	The ship ran aground on the Chico Bank in the River Plate. She was on a voyage from a port in Brazil to Bordeaux, Gironde. She was refloated and resumed her voyage.

== 2 May ==
List of shipwrecks: 2 May 1873
Ship	State	Description
Hope	United Kingdom	The Mersey Flat collided with the tug Alliance (United Kingdom) and sank in the River Mersey. Her crew were rescued.

== 3 May ==
List of shipwrecks: 3 May 1873
Ship	State	Description
Eclipse	United Kingdom	The barque was driven ashore on "Sandy Island", in the Sea of Azov off Yeysk, Russia and was wrecked.
Matilda and Elizabeth	United Kingdom	The brig ran aground on the Maplin Sand, in the North Sea off the coast of Essex. She was on a voyage from London to Hull, Yorkshire.
Nancy	New Zealand	The 17-ton schooner was wrecked when she was driven onto rocks while attempting to cross the bar at the mouth of the New River.

== 4 May ==
List of shipwrecks: 4 May 1873
Ship	State	Description
Flor de Marie	Spain	The steamship struck the quayside and sank at Sunderland, County Durham, United Kingdom. She was on a voyage from Bilbao to Sunderland.
International	United Kingdom	The steamship ran aground on the Nore. She was on a voyage from Bilbao to London. She was refloated with the assistance of a tug and resumed her voyage.

== 5 May ==
List of shipwrecks: 5 May 1873
Ship	State	Description
Atalanta	United Kingdom	The schooner collided with Clarissa (United Kingdom) and ran aground in the River Mersey. Atalanta was on a voyage from Poole, Dorset to Runcorn, Cheshire.
Concord	United Kingdom	The schooner collided with Arcturus (United Kingdom) and ran aground in the River Mersey. Concord was on a voyage from Fowey, Cornwall to Runcorn.
Margaret Hamilton	New South Wales	The whaler, a barque, was wrecked on Norfolk Island.
Maria Josephine	France	The ship was wrecked at "Horn Wich" with the loss of all hands. She was on a voyage from Paimpol, Côtes-du-Nord to Iceland.
Polydor	France	The ship ran aground in the Seine. She was on a voyage from Marseille, Bouches-du-Rhône to Rouen, Seine-Inférieure. She was refloated and towed in to Rouen.
Ventura	Spain	The ship was wrecked on the Orliz Bank, in the River Plate. She was on a voyage from Buenos Aires, Argentina to Havana, Cuba.

== 6 May ==
List of shipwrecks: 6 May 1873
Ship	State	Description
Clara	United Kingdom	The ship ran aground at Llanelly, Glamorgan. She was on a voyage from Llanelly to Rouen, Seine-Inférieure, France. She was refloated and resumed her voyage, but put in to Pembrey, Carmarthenshire in a leaky condition.
Helene	Germany	The brig foundered in the South Atlantic. Her crew were rescued. She was on a voyage from the River Plate to Flekkefjord, Norway.
Livonia	Germany	The ship was driven ashore at Gräsgård, Öland, Sweden. She was on a voyage from Riga, Russia to Lübeck.

== 7 May ==
List of shipwrecks: 7 May 1873
Ship	State	Description
Santa Trinida	Greece	The ship collided with the steamship Flora (Austria-Hungary) and foundered off "Cape Males" with the loss of two of her crew. Survivors were rescued by Flora.
Sarah Margaret	United Kingdom	The ship struck the Whitby Rock and put in to Whitby, Yorkshire.
Sarah Pringle	United Kingdom	The schooner was driven ashore at Ryde, Isle of Wight. She was on a voyage from Newcastle upon Tyne, Northumberland to Poole, Dorset. She was refloated and resumed her voyage.

== 8 May ==
List of shipwrecks: 8 May 1873
Ship	State	Description
Arizona	United States	The steamship collided with another vessel and sank on the St. Clair Flats, in Lake St. Clair. She was later refloated.
Fidela	United Kingdom	The steamship was wrecked at the Receil Lighthouse, Port Elizabeth, Cape Colony. All on board were rescued. She was on a voyage from London to Melbourne, Victoria.
Thomas	United Kingdom	The schooner foundered off Dunbar, Lothian. Her crew were rescued.

== 9 May ==
List of shipwrecks: 9 May 1873
Ship	State	Description
Milan	United Kingdom	The steamship ran aground on the Middle Sand, in the Humber. She was on a voyage from Hull, Yorkshire to Kronstadt, Russia. She was refloated with the assistance of four tugs and resumed her voyage.
Stoomvaart	Netherlands	The steamship ran aground off Brouwershaven, Zeeland.

== 10 May ==
List of shipwrecks: 10 May 1873
Ship	State	Description
Antoinetta Corvetto	Italy	The ship ran aground and was wrecked at Paraíba, Brazil.
Margaret Campbell	New Zealand	The 122-ton schooner parted her cable and was driven ashore at Oamaru.
Plato	United Kingdom	The barque was wrecked on a reef 3 nautical miles (5.6 km) off Huon Island, Solomon Islands. Her eleven crew survived, but ten of them were subsequently murdered. She was on a voyage from Newcastle, New South Wales to Hong Kong.

== 11 May ==
List of shipwrecks: 11 May 1873
Ship	State	Description
Busy Bee	United Kingdom	The schooner was driven ashore near Cowes, Isle of Wight. She was later refloated and towed in to Portsmouth, Hampshire in a leaky condition.
Llanelly	United Kingdom	The steamship ran aground on the Bishop Rock, Isles of Scilly. She floated off and sank. She was on a voyage from Barrow-in-Furness, Lancashire to Solva, Pembrokeshire.
Try	Norway	The barque was driven ashore near the South Stack, Anglesey, United Kingdom. She was on a voyage from Galveston, Texas, United States to Liverpool, Lancashire, United Kingdom. Try was refloated and taken in to Holyhead, Anglesey in a waterlogged condition and was beached there. She was refloated on 29 August and taken into a graving dock for repairs.
William Coutman	United Kingdom	The steamship ran aground at Maassluis, South Holland, Netherlands. She was on a voyage from Goole, Yorkshire to Rotterdam, South Holland.
Zeno	United Kingdom	The steamship suffered an onboard explosion and consequently sank in the Bay of Biscay (46°48′N 8°11′W). Her crew were rescued by the steamship Cairo (United Kingdom). Zeno was on a voyage from Cardiff, Glamorgan to Port Said, Egypt.

== 12 May ==
List of shipwrecks: 12 May 1873
Ship	State	Description
Augusta Sophie	Sweden	The schooner struck a rock and sank off Lindesnes, Norway. Her crew were rescued. She was on a voyage from Blyth, Northumberland, United Kingdom to Norrköping.
City of Dublin	United Kingdom	The steamship ran aground near Falkenberg, Sweden. She was on a voyage from Riga, Russia to Dublin. She was refloated and resumed her voyage
Fenham	United Kingdom	The steamship ran aground off Naissaar, Russia. She was on a voyage from Newcastle upon Tyne, Northumberland to Kronstadt, Russia. She was refloated.
King William	United Kingdom	The ship collided with a foreign schooner and was beached at Tranmere, Cheshire. She was on a voyage from Port Dinorwic, Caernarfonshire to Runcorn, Cheshire.
Liberator	United Kingdom	The ship ran aground south of Arthurstown, County Wexford. She was on a voyage from Waterford to Cardiff, Glamorgan.
Leith	United Kingdom	The steamship was wrecked at Trincomalee, Ceylon. She was on a voyage from Bombay to Bombay, India.
Salvo	United Kingdom	The brig was wrecked at Maceió, Brazil. She was on a voyage from the River Plate to Pernambuco.
Selid	Norway	The ship ran aground and capsized at Berwick upon Tweed, Northumberland. She was on a voyage from Christiania to Berwick upon Tweed.
Whampoa	United Kingdom	The ship was driven ashore and wrecked 4 nautical miles (7.4 km) west of Nash Point, Glamorgan. She was on a voyage from Cardiff, Glamorgan to Yokohama, Japan.

== 14 May ==
List of shipwrecks: 14 May 1873
Ship	State	Description
Betsey	United Kingdom	The Mersey Flat sank in the Horse Channel. She was on a voyage from Liverpool, Lancashire to West Kirby, Cheshire.
"O'Connell"	United States	The fishing boat was lost near the Powder Hole, Cape Cod. Crew saved.
Sirius	Germany	The steamship ran aground off Terneuzen, Zeeland, Netherlands. She was on a voyage from Riga, Russia to Ghent, East Flanders, Belgium. She was later refloated and taken in to Terneuzen.

== 15 May ==
List of shipwrecks: 15 May 1873
Ship	State	Description
Deux Annette	France	The fishing boat collided with the schooner Marie Felix (France) and sank 15 nautical miles (28 km) off Penmarc'h, Finistère with the loss of three of her crew.

== 16 May ==
List of shipwrecks: 16 May 1873
Ship	State	Description
Problem	United Kingdom	The schooner ran aground at Fraserburgh, Aberdeenshire. She was on a voyage from Gothenburg, Sweden to Fraserburgh. She was refloated and taken in to Fraserburgh in a leaky condition.
Ste Anne	France	The ship ran aground at Dunkirk, Nord and broke her back. She was on a voyage from Oran, Algeria to Dunkirk.

== 17 May ==
List of shipwrecks: 17 May 1873
Ship	State	Description
Esk	United Kingdom	The steamship was driven ashore on the south point of Öland, Sweden. She was on a voyage from Riga, Russia to Hull, Yorkshire.
Hurry Pursad	India	The buttelow was run into and sunk in the Indian Ocean by the steamship Tanjore (United Kingdom). Her crew were rescued by Tanjore.
Prospect	United Kingdom	The ship was driven ashore at Wells-next-the-Sea, Norfolk. Her crew were rescued. She was on a voyage from Newcastle upon Tyne, Northumberland to Vila do Conde, Portugal. She was refloated on 24 May and towed in to Wells-next-the-Sea.
Wentworth	United Kingdom	The steamship, a collier, foundered in the North Sea 23 nautical miles (43 km) south east of Spurn Point, Yorkshire with the loss of six of her fourteen crew. Survivors were rescued by the steamship Faraday (flag unknown). Wentworth was on a voyage from South Shields, County Durham to London.

== 18 May ==
List of shipwrecks: 18 May 1873
Ship	State	Description
Catherine	United Kingdom	The schooner struck the Crow Rocks, off the coast of Pembrokeshire, and sank. Her crew were rescued by the schooner Mersey (United Kingdom). Catherine was on a voyage from Llanelly, Glamorgan to Wexford.
Lincoln	Sweden	The schooner was driven ashore and wrecked at Valagrund, near Landskrona. She was refloated in early June and taken in to Landskrona.

== 19 May ==
List of shipwrecks: 19 May 1873
Ship	State	Description
Crocus	United Kingdom	The ship ran aground in the Hooghly River.
Jane Jackson	United Kingdom	The schooner was run down and sunk in the Firth of Forth by the steamship Fitzwilliam (United Kingdom). Her crew were rescued by Fitzwilliam.
Scotia	United Kingdom	The steamship ran aground in the Hooghly River.
William Woodburn	United Kingdom	The ship caught fire at Bombay, India. The fire was extinguished on 21 May.

== 20 May ==
List of shipwrecks: 20 May 1873
Ship	State	Description
Dodo	United Kingdom	The steamship ran aground in the River Lee upstream of Monkstown, County Cork. She was on a voyage from London to Queenstown, County Cork. She was refloated and taken in to Queenstown.
Georgina	United Kingdom	The barque was damaged by fire at South Shields, County Durham.
Rothbury	United Kingdom	The steamship was run into by the steamship Red Sea (United Kingdom) at Gibraltar and was consequently beached with assistance from the tug Lion Belge ( (United Kingdom of Great Britain and Ireland) Gibraltar). She was subsequently placed under repair.
Venus	United Kingdom	The lighter ran aground and sank at the mouth of the River Tees. Her crew were rescued.

== 21 May ==
List of shipwrecks: 21 May 1873
Ship	State	Description
Jeune Catherine	France	The lugger foundered off "Murchalls". Her crew were rescued. She was on a voyage from Dunkirk, Nord to an Irish port.

== 22 May ==
List of shipwrecks: 22 May 1873
Ship	State	Description
Elizabeth	Norway	The barque collided with the steamship Colina (United Kingdom) and sank off the coast of Kent, United Kingdom. Her crew were rescued. Elizabeth was on a voyage from Havre de Grâce, Seine-Inférieure, France to Lillesand.

== 23 May ==
List of shipwrecks: 23 May 1873
Ship	State	Description
Black Swan	United Kingdom	The pilot boat was run down and sunk in the Bristol Channel by the schooner Ocean (United Kingdom) with the loss of one of the two people on board. The survivor was rescued by Ocean.
Colonist	United Kingdom	The barque was wrecked off Darien, Georgia, United States with the loss of most of her crew. She was on a voyage from Brunswick, Georgia to Montevideo, Uruguay.
Talisman	United Kingdom	The steamship was driven ashore at Hellevoetsluis, Zeeland, Netherlands. She was on a voyage from Leith, Lothian to Rotterdam, South Holland, Netherlands. She was refloated the next day and towed in to Hellevoetsluis.

== 24 May ==
List of shipwrecks: 24 May 1873
Ship	State	Description
Australia	unknown	The 162-ton brig was lost close to Cape Campbell, New Zealand. She attempted to round the cape with the brig Scotsman during a heavy gale The captain of the Scotsman prudently turned back from the cape towards Cook Strait. When the gale had abated, his ship rounded the cape and found the wreckage of the Australia, which probably struck a reef. No trace was found of the eight crew.
Elise	Germany	The ship foundered in the Dogger Bank. Her six crew were rescued by the smack Wasp (United Kingdom). Elise was on a voyage from Newport, Monmouthshire, United Kingdom to Königsberg.
Good Design	United Kingdom	The schooner was driven ashore in the Elbe. She was on a voyage from Hamburg, Germany to the River Tyne. She was refloated and assisted in to Cuxhaven, Germany.

== 25 May ==
List of shipwrecks: 25 May 1873
Ship	State	Description
Argo	United Kingdom	The brig collided with the steamship Albion (United Kingdom) and sank in the River Thames at Barking, Essex. Argo was on a voyage from South Shields, County Durham to London.
Glencairn	United Kingdom	The ship struck the quayside at Dunkirk, Nord, France. She was on a voyage from Middlesbrough, Yorkshire to Dunkirk. She sank the next day. She was refloated, repaired and returned to service.
Repealer	United Kingdom	The schooner sank off Rockabill, County Dublin. Her crew were rescued. She was on a voyage from Troon, Ayrshire to Wicklow.

== 26 May ==
List of shipwrecks: 26 May 1873
Ship	State	Description
Active	United Kingdom	The smack was run down and sunk in the North Sea by the steamship Iris (United Kingdom) with the loss of three of her crew.
Aid	United Kingdom	The smack was driven ashore and wrecked near Easthaven, Forfarshire.
Fornax	United Kingdom	The ship was damaged by fire at Galaţi, Ottoman Empire.
Lady Maxwell	United Kingdom	The steamship ran aground in the River Ouse at Goole, Yorkshire. She was on a voyage from Liverpool, Lancashire to Boulogne, Pas-de-Calais, France.
Orrust	Netherlands	The steamship struck rocks off Folkestone, Kent, United Kingdom. She was on a voyage from the Nieuwe Diep to Salcombe, Devon, United Kingdom. She was refloated and resumed her voyage, but consequently put in to Weymouth, Dorset, United Kingdom on 28 May in a leaky condition/>

== 27 May ==
List of shipwrecks: 27 May 1873
Ship	State	Description
Anna Gesina	Germany	The ship was wrecked on Langeoog. Her crew were rescued. She was on a voyage from Newcastle upon Tyne, Northumberland, United Kingdom to Horummersiel.
James	United Kingdom	The ship was damaged by fire at Wivenhoe, Essex.
Laura A. Burnham	United States	The fishing schooner was lost on Sable Island, Nova Scotia. Crew saved.
Ljubezni Sestre	Austria-Hungary	The brig collided with the schooner Dulcea (Spain) and sank 6 nautical miles (11 km) west of Tarifa, Spain. Two of her eleven crew were rescued by Dulcea, the rest by the brigantine Petit Joseph (France). Ljubezni Sestre was on a voyage from Cardiff, Glamorgan, United Kingdom to Thessaloniki, Greece.
Robina	United Kingdom	The ship was driven ashore and wrecked at Port of Ness, Isle of Lewis, Outer Hebrides.
Wellington	United Kingdom	The brig was driven ashore and wrecked at Cromack Point. Her crew were rescued. She was on a voyage from Londonderry to Maryport, Cumberland.
William	United Kingdom	The ship ran aground on the West Sand. She was on a voyage from Blyth, Northumberland to Trouville, Calvados, France. She was refloated and taken in to Great Yarmouth, Norfolk in a leaky condition and was placed under repair.

== 28 May ==
List of shipwrecks: 28 May 1873
Ship	State	Description
Eliza Hunting	United Kingdom	The steamship was driven ashore on Kombens Island, Netherlands East Indies.
Giacolo M.	Italy	The barque collided with the steamship Albatross (United Kingdom) and sank 5 nautical miles (9.3 km) south west of Tarifa, Spain with the loss of four of her twelve crew. Survivors were rescued by Albatross. Giacolo M. was on a voyage from Cartagena, Spain to Cardiff, Glamorgan, United Kingdom.
Johanna Augusta	Norway	The schooner was driven ashore at "Salvoren". She was on a voyage from Sandvík, Faroe Islands to London, United Kingdom.

== 29 May ==
List of shipwrecks: 29 May 1873
Ship	State	Description
City of Manchester	United Kingdom	The ship ran aground at the entrance to Lake Saint Pierre. She was on a voyage from Montreal, Quebec, Canada to Glasgow, Renfrewshire. She was refloated on 31 May and resumed her voyage.

== 30 May ==
List of shipwrecks: 30 May 1873
Ship	State	Description
Amazon	United Kingdom	The steamship ran aground in the Guadalquivir.
Industrie	United Kingdom	The ship departed from Pensacola, Florida, United States for Greenock, Renfrewshire. No further trace, presumed foundered with the loss of all hands.
James Murray	United Kingdom	The ship ran aground in the Hudson River. She was on a voyage from Musquash, New Brunswick, Canada to Queenstown, County Cork.

== 31 May ==
List of shipwrecks: 31 May 1873
Ship	State	Description
Arana	Spain	The steamship sank off Caminha, Portugal. She was on a voyage from Cádiz to Vigo.
Drummond Castle	United Kingdom	The steamship was wrecked on "Chinsan" Island, in the Shengsi Islands, at the mouth of the Yangtze. Her 41 crew survived; nine of them were rescued by a junk She was on a voyage from Hankou, China to London.
Monarch	United Kingdom	The barque ran aground on the South Breakers, and the entrance to St. Andrew Sound with the loss of eight of the seventeen people on board. She was on a voyage from the Doboy Sound to Newcastle upon Tyne, Northumberland.
Seybouse	France	The steamship ran aground at Carloforte, Sardinia, Italy. She was on a voyage from Carloforte to Cette, Hérault. She was refloated and resumed her voyage.
Yoruba	United Kingdom	The steamship struck a sunken rock off Cape Palmas, Liberia and was beached. Her passengers were taken off.

== Unknown date ==
List of shipwrecks: Unknown date in May 1873
Ship	State	Description
Ægean	Netherlands	The steamship was driven ashore in the Maldives. She was on a voyage from Batavia, Netherlands East Indies to Amsterdam, North Holland. She was refloated and put in to Galle, Ceylon, where she arrived on 12 May in a leaky condition.
Alma	France	The ship was driven ashore at Näsudden, Gotland, Sweden. She was on a voyage from Nantes, Loire-Inférieure to Stockholm. She was refloated and taken in to Visby in a leaky condition.
Antoinetta Corvetto	Brazil	The ship ran aground at Paraíba and was wrecked.
Augusta	United Kingdom	The steamship collided with the brig Lufti Huda (Ottoman Empire) off Kavak, Ottoman Empire and was severely damaged. She was on a voyage from Malta to Odesa, Russia.
Beaumaris Castle	United Kingdom	The ship was wrecked off Bermuda before 5 May. She was on a voyage from Calcutta, India to New York, United States.
Bella Maria	United Kingdom	The barque was wrecked on Rodrigues before 2 May. Her crew were rescued by Grand Porienne (France). Bella Maria was on a voyage from Liverpool, Lancashire to Bombay, India.
Brancepeth	United Kingdom	The steamship ran aground on the Haaks Bank, in the North Sea off the coast of Zeeland, Netherlands. She was on a voyage from Cardiff, Glamorgan to Geestemünde, Germany. She was refloated and taken into the Nieuw Diep.
Caledonia	United Kingdom	The schooner ran aground on the Horse Bank, in the Irish Sea off the coast of Lancashire. She was refloated with assistance from the Lytham Lifeboat.
Carolina	United Kingdom	The barque was driven ashore on "Fido". She was refloated and resumed her voyage.
Decio	Italy	The brig was wrecked near Sciacca. Sicily. Her crew were rescued. She was on a voyage from Catania, Sicily to Marseille, Bouches-du-Rhône, France.
Emanuel	United Kingdom	The lugger was wrecked off the coast of Lancashire. Her six crew were rescued by the Lytham Lifeboat.
Emma	United Kingdom	The ship was wrecked at "Chiltepec" before 10 May.
Evangelistra	Flag unknown	The ship collided with another vessel and was beached at Gallipoli, Ottoman Empire. She was on a voyage from Candia, Crete to Constantinople, Ottoman Empire.
Fennechina	Netherlands	The ship was wrecked at Frontera, Mexico before 10 May. She was on a voyage from Liverpool to Frontera.
Garibaldi	Italy	The tug foundered in the Atlantic Ocean 30 nautical miles (56 km) south of Cabo Mondego, Portugal. Her crew were rescued. She was on a voyage from Bristol, Gloucestershire, United Kingdom to an Italian port.
Hecla	(Canada)	The sealer, a brig, was destroyed by fire.
Hilda	United Kingdom	The schooner ran aground on the Mizen Head Bank. She was refloated with assistance from the Arklow Lifeboat.
Hotbank	France	The ship ran aground on the Blinders, off Cape Recife, Cape Colony. She was beached and became a wreck. She was on a voyage from London, United Kingdom to the Cape Colony.
Liscombe	United Kingdom	The ship was abandoned at sea. Her crew were rescued.
L. N. Hvidt	Denmark	The steamship put in to Fredrikshavn on fire. She was on a voyage from Copenhagen to Bergen, Norway.
Maria	Canada	The barque was driven ashore near the Stork Rocks, County Galway, United Kingdom between 5 and 12 May. She was on a voyage from Galway to Saint John, New Brunswick. She was refloated and put back to Galway in a leaky condition.
May	United Kingdom	The ship was driven ashore on Anholt, Denmark. She was on a voyage from West Hartlepool, County Durham to Riga, Russia. She was refloated with assistance from the steamship Baron Hambro (Flag unknown) and resumed her voyage.
Nicomi	United Kingdom	The yacht was abandoned off Bray Head, County Wicklow. All four people on board were rescued by the Greystones Lifeboat.
Oro	France	The brig was wrecked on Santa Maria Island, Azores. She was on a voyage from Africa to Marseille.
Perseverance	United Kingdom	The ship was wrecked at "Chiltepec" before 10 May.
Peter Aneus	Norway	The barque ran aground near Trondheim. She was on a voyage from a Spanish port to Trondheim.
Philadelphia	United States	The ship was wrecked on the Bird Rocks before 26 May. She was on a voyage from Genoa, Italy to Quebec City, Canada.
Radiant	United Kingdom	The barque was driven ashore and damaged on the "Wressen". She was on a voyage from Nyborg, Denmark to Riga. She was later refloated and taken in to Nyborg.
Renaud	Canada	The steamship was wrecked in the Lachine Rapids, in the Saint Lawrence River.
Stella Maria	Canada	The ship was wrecked on Cape Sable Island, Nova Scotia. She was on a voyage from Halifax, Nova Scotia to Saint-Pierre.
Tewkesbury	United Kingdom	The ship ran aground in the Hooghly River. She was on a voyage from Rio de Janeiro, Brazil to Calcutta, India. She was refloated the next day and taken in to Calcutta.
Tjapko Schuringa	Flag unknown	The ship was abandoned in the North Sea. Her crew were rescued by Elsina (Flag unknown). Tjapko Schuringa was on a voyage from Newcastle upon Tyne, Northumberland, United Kingdom to Saint Petersburg, Russia.
Ulleswater	United Kingdom	The steamship was driven ashore on the French coast. She was on a voyage from Newcastle upon Tyne to Rouen, Seine-Inférieure, France. She was refloated with assistance and towed in to Rouen.
Urania	United Kingdom	The ship was wrecked at "Chiltepec" before 10 May.
Zeven Gebroeder	Netherlands	The ship was wrecked at Frontera before 10 May. She was on a voyage from Liverpool to Frontera.
