= 28th Battalion (Australia) =

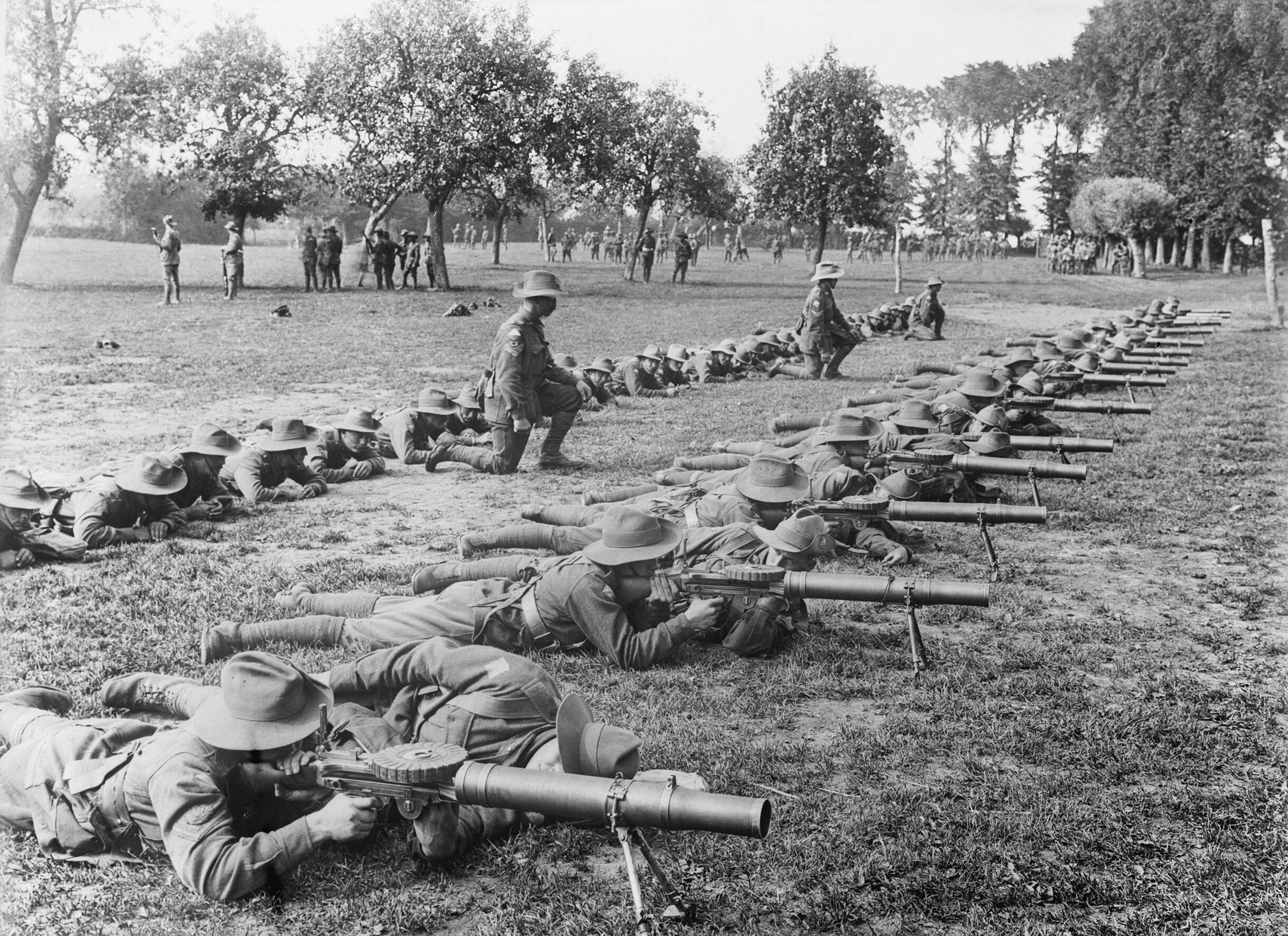
- Men of 28th Battalion during a Lewis gun drill at Renescure, c. 1917.
- Active: 1915–1919; 1921–1946; 1952–1960; 1966–1987
- Country: Australia
- Branch: Australian Army
- Type: Infantry
- Part of: 7th Brigade, 2nd Division (1915–19); 13th Brigade, III Corps; 13th Brigade, 5th Division
- Nickname: The Swan Regiment
- Motto: Urgens
- March: Heart of Oak; Colonel Bogey
- Engagements: First World War: Gallipoli campaign; Western Front; Second World War: New Britain Campaign

Insignia
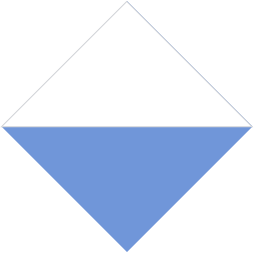
- Unit colour patch

The 28th Battalion was an infantry battalion of the Australian Army. It was raised in early 1915 as part of the First Australian Imperial Force for service during the First World War and formed part of the 7th Brigade, attached to the 2nd Division. It fought during the final stages of the Gallipoli campaign in late 1915 and then on the Western Front between 1916 and 1918. At the end of the war, the 28th was disbanded in 1919 but was re-raised in 1921, as a part-time unit based in Western Australia. During the Second World War, the 28th undertook defensive duties in Australia for the majority of the conflict, before seeing action against the Japanese in the New Britain campaign in 1944–1945. The battalion was disbanded in March 1946 but was re-formed in 1948 as an amalgamated unit with the 16th Battalion, before being unlinked in 1952 and re-raised as a full battalion following the reintroduction of national service. It remained on the Australian Army's order of battle until 1960 when it was subsumed into the Royal Western Australia Regiment, but was later re-raised in 1966 as a remote area infantry battalion. In 1977, the 28th was reduced to an independent rifle company, and in 1987 was amalgamated into the 11th/28th Battalion, Royal Western Australia Regiment.

== History ==
=== First World War ===
The 28th Battalion came into existence on 16 April 1915 when it was raised at Blackboy Camp, in Western Australia. Formed as part of the Australian Imperial Force (AIF), an all volunteer formation raised for overseas service during the First World War, the 28th Battalion's first batch of volunteers came from personnel who had originally been allocated to the 24th Battalion. The 24th was being raised at Broadmeadows in Victoria, and it had been intended that the 24th would be raised from all states of Australia with recruits travelling to Victoria to form the unit, but the higher than expected number of volunteers at Broadmeadows at the time meant that the 24th was raised as a Victorian battalion, and the Western Australians, who had been intended to form a sub unit within the 24th, were reallocated to the 28th which was subsequently raised mainly from Western Australian recruits.

The 28th Battalion was subsequently allocated to the 7th Brigade, which besides the 28th and several support units, also consisted of the 25th, 26th and 27th Battalions, which were drawn from the states of Queensland, Tasmania and South Australia, and which completed their training separately before joining each other in Egypt. With an authorised strength of 1,023 men, the battalion's first commanding officer was Lieutenant Colonel Herbert Collett. After completing rudimentary training, the 28th embarked on the transport Ascanius on 9 June and sailed from Fremantle to Egypt via the Red Sea.

The 28th arrived in Egypt in July and concentrated along with the rest of the 7th Brigade at Abbassia, near Cairo, where they were assigned to the newly formed Australian 2nd Division. Two months of training followed, as the division was readied for action; this process was put on hold in September when elements of the division were dispatched to Gallipoli to provide reinforcements for the Australian and New Zealand forces that had been fighting around Anzac Cove since April. The campaign was almost over, but the decision to evacuate had not been confirmed and the 7th Brigade was dispatched in early September. Upon arrival the brigade was temporarily attached to the New Zealand and Australian Division as reinforcements, occupying positions north-east of Anzac Cove around "Cheshire Ridge". They remained on the peninsula for the next few months, manning the trenches, improving defences and defending the beachhead until the evacuation in mid-December, when they were withdrawn back to Lemnos Island. Casualties during the 28th's brief involvement in the campaign were described by the Australian War Memorial as "light", and the battalion's strength on departing the peninsula was 24 officers and 667 other ranks.

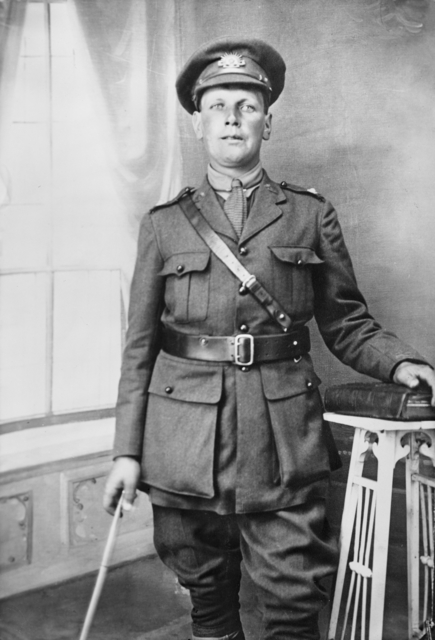
Alfred Gaby, the 28th Battalion's sole Victoria Cross recipient, who received the award for actions around Villers-Bretonneux during the Hundred Days Offensive.

After spending Christmas on Lemnos, the 28th returned to Egypt in early January 1916. Further training followed before the 7th Brigade was deployed in defence of the Suez Canal. At this time, the AIF was reorganised and expanded in preparation for future operations. Two new infantry divisions were formed from the experienced troops of the 1st Division who had deployed to Gallipoli at the start of the campaign, while a third division was raised in Australia from scratch. The 2nd Division was largely left untouched, so that it could complete its formation which had been interrupted by its deployment to Gallipoli. The 7th Brigade subsequently returned to the command of the 2nd Division and the 28th Battalion – along with the rest of the 7th Brigade – would remain with that formation for the rest of the war. In mid-March 1916, the 28th was transferred to France, as part of the first body of Australian troops to deploy to the European battlefield. In early April, the 28th Battalion entered the front line around Armentières, holding the right hand sector of the 7th Brigade's line. For the next two-and-a-half years, they would fight in the trenches of the Western Front in both Belgium and France and take part in numerous battles.

The 28th's first major action came during the Battle of Pozières in late July and early August when they took part in two attacks. During the first attack, the 28th suffered heavily when they were committed to a night-time attack on the heights that got held up in heavy wire entanglements that the preparatory bombardment had failed to destroy; the battalion's losses were the heaviest in the 7th Brigade, amounting to 10 officers and 360 other ranks. A follow-up attack was undertaken on 4 August, which proved more successful, eventually securing the objective. The following day, the Australians were subjected to heavy shelling before they were withdrawn on 6 August. After this, the 28th was moved to a quieter sector around Ypres before returning to the Somme in the later part of 1916, and taking part in further fighting around Flers. In early 1917, the Germans began a surprise withdrawal along the front, which enabled them to hold the line with fewer troops, thus gaining a pool of reserves. When the Allies discovered this, a brief advance followed, before they came up against the strongly prepared defences of the Hindenburg Line. After this, a series of attacks followed with the 28th Battalion being utilised mainly in supporting roles for the remainder of the year. Actions were fought at Bullecourt, Menin Road, Broodseinde and Poelcappelle during this time.

The battalion wintered in Belgium, but early in 1918 was transferred to the Somme again in response to the German spring offensive. In late March and into April, they defended the line around Villers-Bretonneux as the Allies fought to defend the vital railhead of Amiens, before providing support to the 6th Brigade's attack on Ville-sur-Ancre in May. A brief lull followed in June and July as the Allies attempted to regain the initiative, during which the 28th was involved in a minor action around Morlancourt. On 8 August, the Allies launched their Hundred Days Offensive during which the 28th Battalion was initially engaged around Villers-Bretonneux. It was there, on the first day of the offensive, that Lieutenant Alfred Gaby, performed the deeds that led to him becoming the 28th Battalion's first, and only, Victoria Cross recipient. A series of advances followed as the Allies exploited their initial success and sought to break the Hindenburg Line. In late August, the Australian 2nd Division advanced to the Somme River, and on 29 August, as the 7th Brigade attacked around Biaches, the 28th was assigned the task of capturing the Amiens–Peronne railway bridge. The following day, they forced their way across the river around Peronne, and during the subsequent Battle of Mont St Quentin–Peronne, they joined the 7th Brigade's advance towards Aizecourt-le-Haut. They continued fighting until early October 1918 when they were withdrawn from the line, just after an attack on the Beaureviour Line, around the village of Estrees.

The fighting throughout 1918 had heavily depleted the Australian units, which had been unable to make good their losses, and on 5 October, the entire Australian Corps was withdrawn for rest and reorganisation. The battalion remained out of the line until the war ended in November, after which they began to demobilise. The process was slow as personnel were repatriated back to Australia in drafts and consequently the battalion was not disbanded until March 1919. Throughout the war, casualties amongst the 28th totalled 787 killed and 2,241 wounded. The battalion received 17 battle honours for its war service, which were bestowed in 1927.

=== Inter-war years ===
The demobilisation of the AIF was completed in early 1921, at which time Australia's part-time military force, the Citizens Force, was reorganised to reflect the divisional structure and numerical designations of the AIF. As a result, the 28th Battalion was re-raised in Western Australia, as part of the 13th Brigade, within the 5th Military District. Upon formation, the new battalion drew personnel from parts of the 11th, 16th and 28th Infantry Regiments. In 1927, when territorial designations were approved for all Citizen Forces infantry battalions, the 28th adopted the title of the "Swan Valley Regiment", although in 1934 this was changed to the "Swan Regiment". The battalion's motto – the Latin word Urgens – was approved in 1927. It was headquartered in Perth, but also had detachments in Northam and Western Australia. At the outset, in 1921 the Citizen Forces units were maintained through a mixture of voluntary and compulsory service, but in late 1929, the scheme was suspended by the Scullin Labor government, and replaced by an all-volunteer "Militia" scheme. Numbers fell sharply and training opportunities for those that did volunteer were limited throughout the 1930s. Activities during this period were limited with training consisting of just one six-day annual camp, which was augmented by monthly half-day parades, amounting to a further six days of training. Training was also hampered by the austerity measures that were necessitated by the economic hardships of the Great Depression, which meant that the equipment provided during this time was largely obsolete, being mainly First World War vintage, and provided in insufficient numbers.

=== Second World War and beyond ===
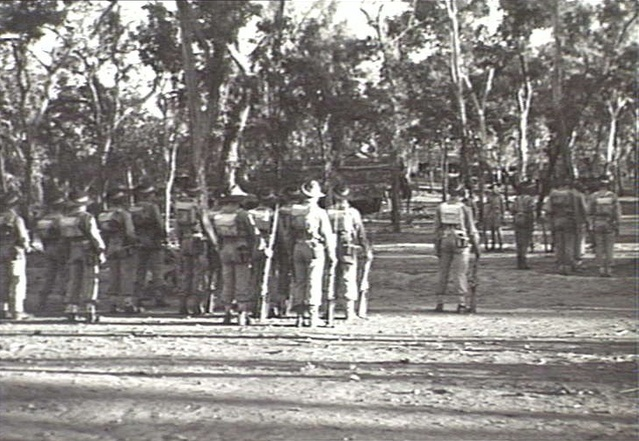
28th Battalion troops conducting a changing-of-the-guard ceremony in Darwin, August 1944.

Throughout the early part of the Second World War, the 28th Battalion undertook brief periods of continuous service, providing training to recruits who were enlisted following the re-establishment of conscription in January 1940 to improve the nation's overall readiness. The provisions of the Defence Act precluded the Militia from being sent outside Australian territory to fight, so many of the battalion's personnel volunteered to serve in the Second Australian Imperial Force (2nd AIF). After Japan's entry into the war, the 13th Brigade's units were mobilised for full-time service and pressed into home defence with III Corps, undertaking garrison duties to defend Western Australia against a possible invasion. When that threat passed, they moved to the Northern Territory, and the 28th Battalion established itself around 49-Mile Creek. Late in the war, the 13th Brigade was reassigned from the 4th Division to the 5th, and in November 1944 they were committed to the New Britain campaign, landing at Jacquinot Bay the following month and later established themselves around Waitavalo. From then until the end of the war in August 1945, the 28th took part in a containment campaign against the much larger Japanese force on the island, as the Australians attempted to confine them to the Gazelle Peninsula and Rabaul. The 28th kept up a program of patrolling through the jungle, but made little contact with the Japanese. After the war, the battalion remained on the island processing Japanese prisoners of war until being repatriated back to Australia in January 1946. They were disbanded two months later as part of the demobilisation process. Throughout the war, the 28th lost six men killed on active service and one wounded. It received one battle honour for its service in 1961, but was also entrusted with the 16 battle honours awarded to the 2nd AIF's 2/28th Battalion.

Once Australia's wartime military forces had been demobilised, the part-time force was re-established in the guise of the Citizens Military Force (CMF), which was formed in 1948. Within this, an amalgamated 16th/28th Battalion was raised. This battalion existed until August 1952 when, following the reintroduction of national service, the 28th Battalion was re-raised in its own right, based in East Perth with sub-units at Albany, Katanning and Geraldton. Heart of Oak was approved as the battalion's regimental march in 1953, but it was replaced the following year by Colonel Bogey. In 1960, following the introduction of the Pentropic organisation and the suspension of national service, this battalion was subsumed into the newly formed Royal Western Australia Regiment, providing three company-sized elements to the regiment's 1st Battalion (1 RWAR). The Australian Army ceased using the Pentropic organisation in July 1965 and at this time 1 RWAR was split into two smaller battalions: 1 RWAR and 2 RWAR. In early 1966, these were renumbered 16 RWAR and 11 RWAR, with the companies that had originally come from the 28th Battalion being allocated to 16 RWAR. In October 1966, when national service was reintroduced, the 28th Battalion was re-formed as a full battalion known as 28 RWAR, and fulfilling the role of a remote area battalion, catering for the training needs of men eligible for call up who wished to exercise the option to serve in the CMF instead of the Regular Army, but who could not parade regularly due to where they lived or what civilian occupation they held. The national service scheme ended in December 1972, after which many who had joined the CMF to defer full-time national service took their discharge. Numbers fell significantly and in 1977 the 28th Battalion was reduced to an independent rifle company, along with the 11th Battalion. This continued until October 1987, when the two companies were amalgamated to form the current 11th/28th Battalion, Royal Western Australia Regiment.

== Alliances ==
The 28th Battalion held the following alliances:

- United Kingdom – The Gloucestershire Regiment.

== Battle honours ==
The 28th Battalion received the following battle honours (including those inherited from the 2/28th Battalion):

- First World War: Somme 1916–18; Pozières; Bullecourt; Ypres 1917; Menin Road; Polygon Wood; Broodseinde; Poelcappelle; Passchendaele; Amiens; Albert 1918; Mont St. Quentin; Hindenburg Line; Beaurevoir; France and Flanders 1916–18; Gallipoli 1915; Egypt 1915–16.
- Second World War: North Africa 1941–42; Defence of Tobruk; Defence of Alamein Line; Tel el Makh Khad; Sanyet el Miteirya; Qattara Track; El Alamein; South West Pacific 1943–45; Lae-Nadzab; Busu River; Finschhafen; Defence of Scarlet Beach; Siki Cove; Gusika; Borneo; Labuan; and Beaufort.

== Commanding officers ==
First World War

- Herbert Bayley Collett
- George Arthur Read
- Patrick Currie.

Second World War

- Michael Joseph Anketell
- James Gerald Brennan
- Henry Humfrey Marsden Chilton
- Alfred Joseph Proud.
