= James Newland =

Australian Army officer and Victoria Cross recipient

James Newland VC
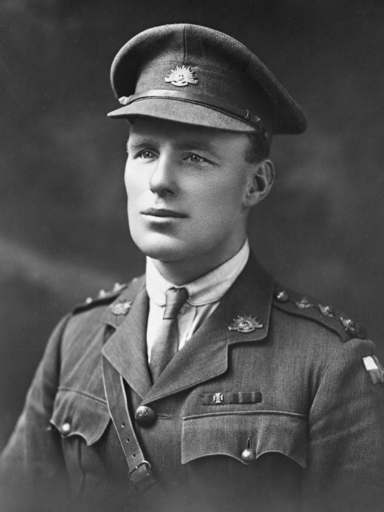
- Captain James Newland c.1918
- Born: 22 August 1881; Highton, Victoria
- Died: 19 March 1949 (aged 67); Caulfield, Victoria
- Military career
- Allegiance: Australia
- Branch: Australian Army
- Service years: 1899–1902; 1903–1909; 1910–1941
- Rank: Lieutenant Colonel
- Unit: 12th Battalion (1914–18)
- Conflicts: Second Boer War; First World War; Gallipoli Campaign; Landing at Anzac Cove; Western Front; Battle of the Somme; Battle of Pozières; Battle of Mouquet Farm; Battle of Arras; Second World War
- Awards: Victoria Cross; Meritorious Service Medal; Mentioned in Despatches

James Ernest Newland, VC (22 August 1881 – 19 March 1949) was an Australian soldier, policeman and a recipient of the Victoria Cross, the highest decoration for gallantry "in the face of the enemy" that can be awarded to members of the British and Commonwealth armed forces. Newland was awarded the Victoria Cross following three separate actions in April 1917, during attacks against German forces retreating to the Hindenburg Line. While in command of a company, Newland successfully led his men in several assaults on German positions and repulsed subsequent counter-attacks.

Born in the Victorian town of Highton, Newland joined the Australian military in 1899 and saw active service during the Second Boer War. He continued to serve in the Australian Army's permanent forces on his return to Australia, and completed several years' service in the artillery. Transferring to the militia in 1907, Newland became a police officer in Tasmania before re-joining the permanent forces in 1910. After the outbreak of the First World War, he was appointed to the Australian Imperial Force and was among the first wave of men to land at Gallipoli. In the following days, Newland was wounded and evacuated to Egypt where he was commissioned as a second lieutenant.

Transferring to the Western Front in 1916, Newland was mentioned in despatches for his leadership while commanding a company during an attack at Mouquet Farm. He was wounded twice more during the war and medically discharged in March 1918; he returned to service with the permanent army. Newland held several appointments between the two world wars, and retired a lieutenant colonel in 1941. He died of heart failure in 1949.

== Early life ==
Newland was born in the Geelong suburb of Highton, Victoria, on 22 August 1881 to William Newland, a labourer, and his wife Louisa Jane (née Wall). In 1899, he enlisted in the Commonwealth Military Forces and was assigned to the 4th Battalion, Australian Commonwealth Horse, as a private. The unit later embarked for South Africa, where Newland saw active service in Cape Town during the Second Boer War.

Returning to Australia in 1902, Newland re-settled in Victoria and joined the Royal Australian Artillery in July the following year. He served in the artillery for over four years, before transferring to the militia in September 1907. In 1909, he became a police officer in the Tasmanian Police Force, where he remained until August 1910, when he re-enlisted in the permanent army. He was posted to the Australian Instructional Corps; he served with this unit until the outbreak of the First World War. In a ceremony at Sheffield, Tasmania, on 27 December 1913, Newland married Florence May Mitchell.

== First World War ==
On 17 August 1914, Newland transferred to the newly raised Australian Imperial Force following the British Empire's declaration of war on Germany and her allies. Assigned to the 12th Battalion, he was made its regimental quartermaster sergeant and embarked from Hobart aboard HMAT Geelong on 20 October, bound for Egypt. After a brief stop in Western Australia, the troopship arrived at its destination seven weeks later. The 12th Battalion spent the next four months training in the Egyptian desert.

At the commencement of the Gallipoli Campaign, the 3rd Australian Brigade—of which the 12th Battalion was part—was designated as the covering force for the ANZAC landing, and as such was the first unit ashore on 25 April 1915, at approximately 04:30. Newland was wounded in the days following the landing, suffering a gunshot wound to his arm, and was evacuated to the 1st General Hospital. While at the hospital, he was commissioned as a second lieutenant on 22 May, before returning to the 12th Battalion four days later.

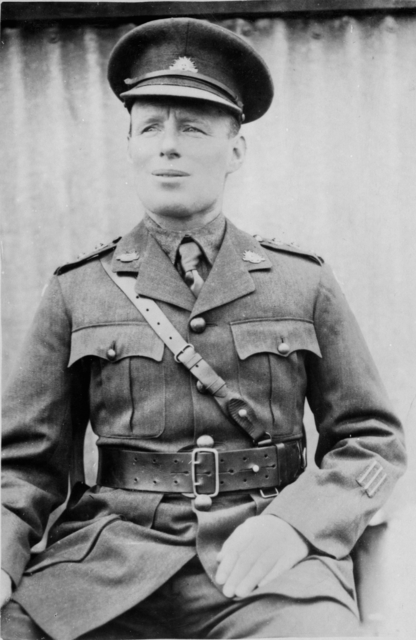
Outdoor portrait of Captain James Newland

Newland was engaged in operations on the Gallipoli Peninsula until 9 June, when he was withdrawn from the area and placed in command of the 12th Battalion's transport elements stationed in Egypt. Promoted to lieutenant on 15 October, he was hospitalised for ten days in November due to dengue fever. Following the Allied evacuation of Gallipoli in December, the 12th Battalion returned to Egypt where Newland continued as transport officer. Promoted to captain on 1 March 1916, he was made adjutant of the 12th Battalion fifteen days later. It embarked for France and the Western Front later that month.

Disembarking at Marseille, the 12th Battalion was initially posted to the Fleurbaix sector of France. After involvement in minor operations, it transferred to the Somme in July, where it participated in the Battle of Pozières, its first major French action. Newland was posted to command A Company from 8 August, and was subsequently moved to Sausage Valley along with the rest of the 12th Battalion in preparation for an attack on Mouquet Farm.

Mouquet Farm was a ruined complex connected to several German strongpoints, and formed part of the Thiepval defences. On 21 August, Newland led his company in an assault on a series of trenches slightly north east of the farm. By 18:30, the company had captured its objectives and several of Newland's men rushed off in pursuit of the retreating Germans. Newland immediately stopped them and organised the company into a defensive position; the trench was consolidated by 05:00 the next morning. Praised for his "... great coolness and courage under heavy fire" during the attack, he was recommended for the Military Cross. The award was downgraded to a mention in despatches, the announcement of which was published in a supplement to the London Gazette on 4 January 1917.

After its involvement at Pozières and Mouquet Farm, the 12th Battalion was briefly transferred to the Ypres sector in Belgium in September, before returning to Bernafay Wood on the Somme late the following month. Newland was admitted to the 38th Casualty Clearing Station with pyrexia on 4 December. He was moved to the 2nd General Hospital at Le Havre, and returned to the 12th Battalion two weeks later following recuperation. On the same day, he was attached to the headquarters of the 2nd Australian Brigade for duty as a staff officer. He was granted leave on 21 January 1917 on completion of this stint.

Re-joining the 12th Battalion, Newland once again assumed command of A Company. On 26 February 1917, he was tasked with leading it during the 12th Battalion's attack on the village of La Barque during the German retreat to the Hindenburg Line. At Bark Trench, a position on the north side of the centre of La Barque, the company encountered a German strongpoint and Newland received a gunshot wound to the face. He was admitted to the 1st Australian Field Ambulance, and returned to the 12th Battalion on 25 March after a period of hospitalisation at the 7th Stationary Hospital in Boulogne.

=== Victoria Cross ===
By early April 1917, there remained three German-held outpost villages—Boursies, Demicourt and Hermies—between the area to the south of the I Anzac Corps position and the Hindenburg Line. An attack by the 1st Australian Division to capture them was planned for 9 April, the same day the British offensive opened at Arras. For his actions on three separate occasions during the assault, Newland was awarded the Victoria Cross.

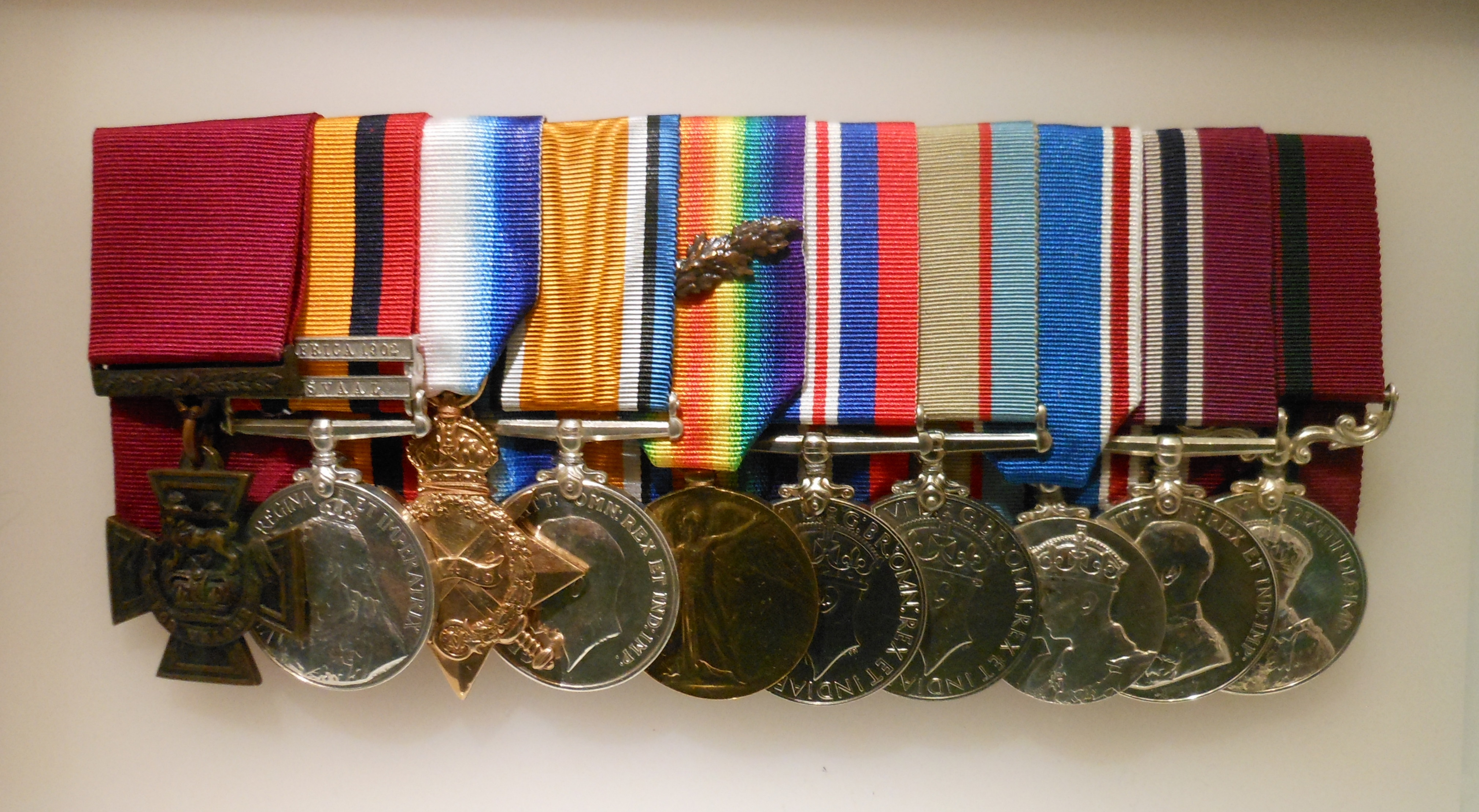
James Newland's medals at the Australian War Memorial, Canberra

On the night of 7/8 April, the 12th Battalion was tasked with the capture of Boursies, on the Bapaume–Cambrai road. The attack was a feint to mislead the German forces on the direction from which Hermies was to be assaulted. Leading A Company as well as an attached platoon from B Company, Newland began his advance on the village at 03:00. The company was soon subject to heavy rifle and machine gun fire from a derelict mill approximately 400 metres (440 yd) short of the village, and began to suffer heavy casualties. Rallying his men, Newland charged the position and bombed the Germans with grenades. The attack dislodged the Germans, and the company secured the area and continued its advance.

Throughout 8 April, the Australians were subjected to heavy shellfire from German forces. At approximately 22:00, the Germans launched a fierce counter-attack under the cover of a barrage of bombs and trench mortars against A Company's position at the mill. They had some initial success and entered the forward posts of the mill, which were occupied by a platoon of Newland's men under the command of Sergeant John Whittle. Newland, bringing up a platoon from the battalion's reserve company, charged the attackers and re-established the lost ground with Whittle's assistance. The 12th Battalion was relieved by the 11th Battalion on 10 April, having succeeded in capturing Boursies at the cost of 240 casualties, of which 70 were killed or missing.

After a four-day reprieve from the frontline, the 12th Battalion relieved the 9th Battalion at Lagnicourt on 14 April. Around dawn the next day, the Germans launched a severe counter-attack against the 1st Australian Division's line. Breaking through, they forced back the 12th Battalion's D Company, which was to the right of Newland's A Company. Soon surrounded and under attack on three sides, Newland withdrew the company to a sunken road which had been held by Captain Percy Cherry during the capture of the village three weeks earlier, and lined the depleted company out in a defensive position on each bank.

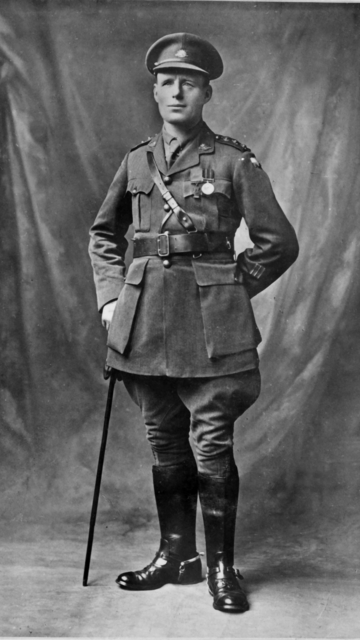
Captain James Newland c. 1918

The German forces attacked Newland's company several times during the battle, but were repulsed each time. During one of the assaults, Newland observed that the German attack was weakening and gathered a party of twenty men. Leading the group, he charged the Germans and seized forty as prisoners. As reinforcements from the 9th Battalion began to arrive, a combined counter-attack was launched and the line recaptured by approximately 11:00. During the engagement, the 12th Battalion suffered 125 casualties, including 66 killed or missing. Newland and Whittle were both awarded the Victoria Cross for their actions at Boursies and Lagnicourt; they were the only two permanent members of the Australian military to receive the decoration during the war. At 35 years and 7 months old, Newland was also the oldest Australian Victoria Cross recipient of the First World War.

The full citation for Newland's Victoria Cross appeared in a supplement to the London Gazette on 8 June 1917:

War Office, 8th June, 1917.

His Majesty the KING has been graciously pleased to approve of the award of the Victoria Cross to the undermentioned Officers, Non-commissioned Officers and Men: —

Capt. James Ernest Newlands, [sic] Inf. Bn., Aus. Imp. Force.

For most conspicuous bravery and devotion to duty, in the face of heavy odds, on three separate occasions.

On the first occasion he organised the attack by his company on a most important objective, and led personally, under heavy fire, a bombing attack. He then rallied his company, which had suffered heavy casualties, and he was one of the first to reach the objective.

On the following night his company, holding the captured position, was heavily counter-attacked. By personal exertion, utter disregard of fire, and judicious use of reserves, he succeeded in dispersing the enemy and regaining the position.

On a subsequent occasion, when the company on his left was overpowered and his own company attacked from the rear, he drove off a combined attack which had developed from these directions.

These attacks were renewed three or four times, and it was Capt. Newland's tenacity and disregard for his own safety that encouraged the men to hold out.

The stand made by this officer was of the greatest importance, and produced far-reaching results.

=== Later war service ===
In early May 1917, the 12th Battalion was involved in the British and Australian attempt to capture the village of Bullecourt. While engaged in this operation on 6 May, Newland was wounded for the third and final time of the war by a gunshot to his left armpit. Initially admitted to the 5th Field Ambulance, he was transferred to No 1 Red Cross Hospital, Le Touquet, the next day. The injury necessitated treatment in England, and Newland was shipped to a British hospital eight days later.

On recovering from his wounds, Newland attended an investiture ceremony at Buckingham Palace on 21 July, where he was decorated with his Victoria Cross by King George V. Later the same day, Newland boarded a ship to Australia. It arrived in Melbourne on 18 September, and Newland travelled to Tasmania. He was discharged from the Australian Imperial Force as medically unfit on 2 March 1918.

== Later life ==
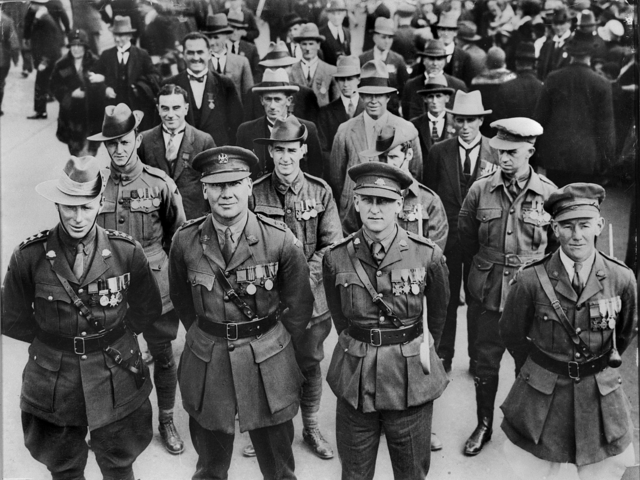
A group of Victoria Cross recipients lined up to march on Anzac Day in Melbourne, 1927. Newland is front row, far left.

Following his discharge, Newland retained the rank of captain and returned to service with the permanent military forces. Between the two world wars, he held several appointments in the army, including adjutant and quartermaster of the 8th, 49th, 52nd, 38th and 12th Battalions, as well as area officer and recruiting officer. In 1924, Newland's wife Florence died of tuberculosis. On 30 April 1925, he married Heather Vivienne Broughton in a ceremony at St Paul's Anglican Church, Bendigo; the couple would later have a daughter. Promoted to major on 1 May 1930, Newland was awarded the Meritorious Service Medal in 1935.

With the outbreak of the Second World War, Newland was seconded for duties as quartermaster instructor at the 4th Division headquarters. On 10 May 1940, he assumed his final army appointment as quartermaster, A Branch, at Army Headquarters in Melbourne. He served in this position until August 1941, when he was placed on the retired list with the honorary rank of lieutenant colonel.

In retirement, Newland served as Assistant Commissioner of the Australian Red Cross Society in the Northern Territory during the later months of 1941. He joined the inspection staff at the Ammunition Factory in Footscray on 2 January 1942. At his home in Caulfield, Victoria, on 19 March 1949, he died suddenly of heart failure at the age of 67. He was accorded a funeral with full military honours, and was buried at Brighton Cemetery. In 1984, Newland's daughter, Dawn, donated her father's medals to the Australian War Memorial in Canberra, where they currently reside.
