= Herbert Collett =

Australian politician (1877–1947)

The Honourable Herbert Collett CMG, DSO, VD
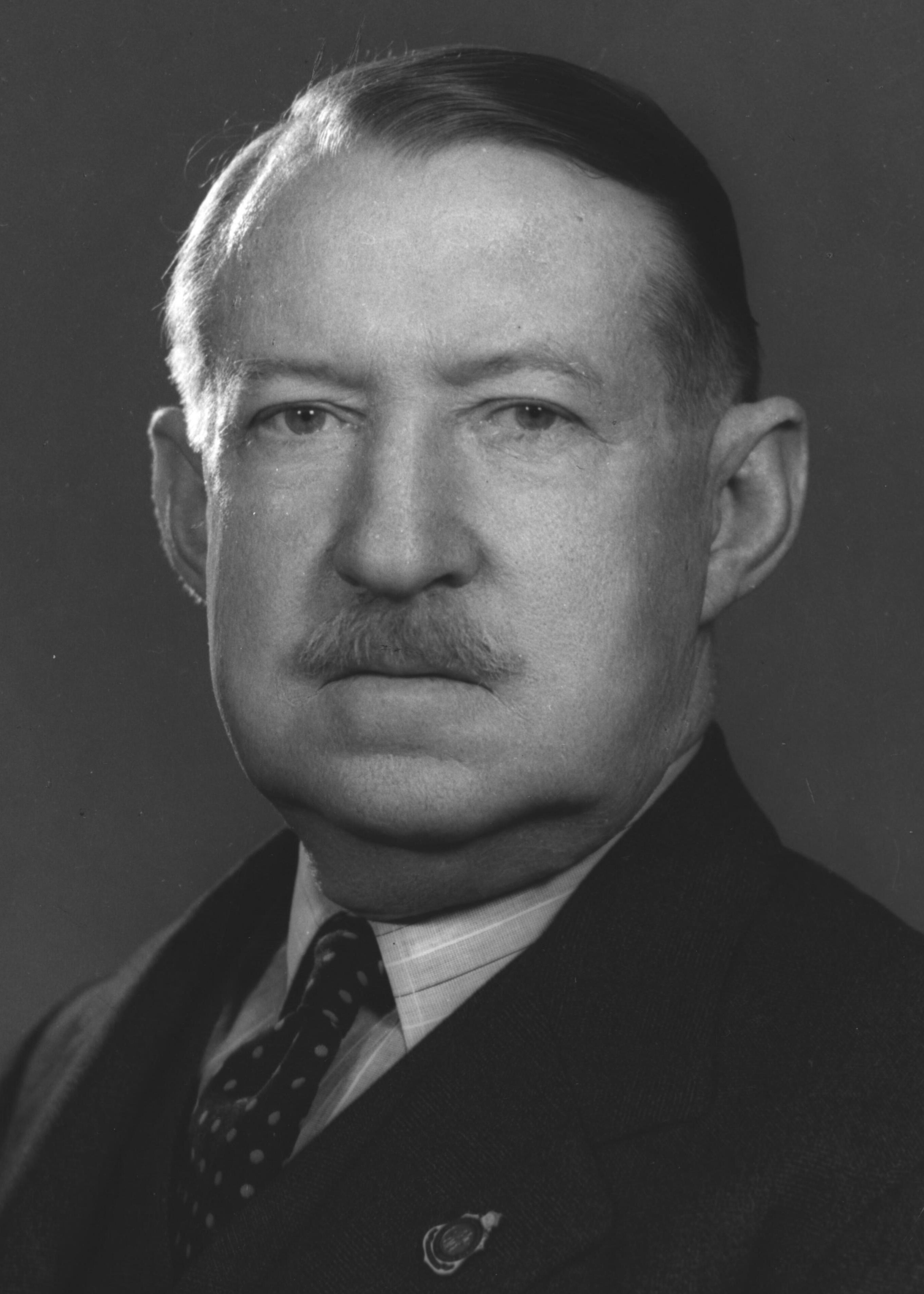
- Collett in 1940

Senator for Western Australia
- In office 6 April 1933 – 30 June 1947
- Preceded by: Hal Colebatch

Personal details
- Born: 12 November 1877 St. Peter Port, Guernsey
- Died: 15 August 1947 (aged 69) Mount Lawley, Western Australia
- Resting place: Karrakatta Cemetery, Perth
- Party: United Australia Party (1931–44); Liberal Party (1944–47)
- Occupation: Librarian

Military service
- Allegiance: Australia
- Branch/service: Citizen Military Forces; Australian Imperial Force
- Years of service: 1894–1927
- Rank: Colonel
- Commands: 13th Brigade (1921–27); 22nd Brigade (1920–21); No. 2 Command Depot (1918–19); 4th Training Brigade (1916–17); 28th Battalion (1915–16, 1917–18); 11th Australian Infantry Regiment (1908–15)
- Battles/wars: First World War; Gallipoli campaign; Western Front; Battle of Pozières; First Battle of Passchendaele
- Awards: Companion of the Order of St Michael and St George; Distinguished Service Order; Mentioned in Despatches; Volunteer Officers' Decoration

Herbert Brayley Collett CMG, DSO, VD (12 November 1877 – 15 August 1947) was an Australian politician, librarian and soldier. He was a Senator for Western Australia from 1933 to 1947, representing the United Australia Party (UAP) until 1945 and then the Liberal Party. He held ministerial office in the Menzies and Fadden governments from 1939 to 1941.

== Early life ==
Collett was born in St. Peter Port, Guernsey and arrived with his family in Western Australia in October 1884. He was educated at Perth Grammar School and became a librarian at the Victoria Public Library in 1891. He married Anne Whitfield in April 1904.

== Military service ==
Collett joined the Metropolitan Rifle Volunteers at the age of 16 and rose to command the 11th Australian Infantry Regiment as a lieutenant colonel in 1908. With the outbreak of the First World War he commanded the 28th Battalion of the Australian Imperial Force from 23 April 1915 and he served at Gallipoli, in Egypt and Sinai and in France. On 29 July 1916, he was wounded at the Battle of Pozières. He returned to action on 12 October 1917 at the First Battle of Passchendaele. He was promoted to colonel in June 1918 and discharged in September 1919. He was mentioned in despatches and was made a Companion of the Distinguished Service Order in 1917, a Companion of the Order of St Michael and St George in 1919 and was promoted brevet colonel.

Collett was assistant general secretary of Perth's amalgamated library, museum and art gallery from 1915 to 1933 and president of the Western Australia branch of the Returned Sailors and Soldiers' Imperial League from 1925 to 1933.

== Political career ==
In April 1933, Collett was appointed to fill a casual vacancy in the Australian Senate, representing the United Australia Party. In parliament he was particularly concerned with military matters and benefits for ex-servicemen and was Minister in charge of War Service Homes from April 1939 to June 1941, when he became Minister for Repatriation until the fall of the Fadden government in October 1941. He was also Vice-President of the Executive Council and Minister in charge of Scientific and Industrial Research from August to October 1940. He was defeated at the 1946 election, completing his Senate term in July 1947. Shortly after he died of heart disease, survived by his wife and two sons.

== Notes ==
Political offices
New title	Minister without portfolio administering War Service Homes; Minister in charge of War Service Homes; 1939–1941	Title abolished
Preceded by Henry Gullett	Vice-President of the Executive Council; 1940	Succeeded by George McLeay
Preceded by Henry Gullett	Minister in charge of Scientific and Industrial Research; 1940	Succeeded by Harold Holt
Preceded by George McLeay	Minister for Repatriation; 1941	Succeeded by Charles Frost
