= Alfred Gaby =

Australian recipient of the Victoria Cross

Alfred Gaby VC
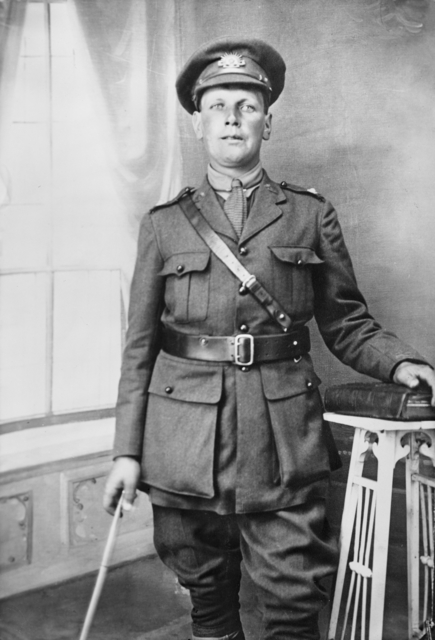
- Second Lieutenant Alfred Gaby, June 1917
- Born: 25 January 1892; Ringarooma, Australia
- Died: 11 August 1918 (aged 26); Lihons, France
- Military career
- Allegiance: Australia
- Branch: Australian Imperial Force
- Service years: 1916–1918
- Rank: Lieutenant
- Units: 28th Battalion
- Conflicts: First World War; Western Front; Battle of Passchendaele; Second Battle of Passchendaele (WIA); Hundred Days Offensive; Battle of Amiens †
- Awards: Victoria Cross

Alfred Edward Gaby, VC (25 January 1892 – 11 August 1918) was an Australian recipient of the Victoria Cross, the highest award for gallantry in the face of the enemy that can be awarded to British and Commonwealth forces.

Born in Tasmania, Gaby worked as a farmer and then a labourer before enlisting in the Australian Imperial Force in 1916 and volunteering to serve overseas. Serving initially in the ranks, Gaby was quickly promoted, having previously served as a part-time soldier before the war, and was commissioned in 1917. He was one of 64 Australians to receive the award for their actions during the First World War, receiving it for his actions during an attack around Villers-Bretonneux in France during the Battle of Amiens that took place at the start of the Allied Hundred Days Offensive. He was killed three days later, at the age of 26, while leading another attack around Lihons.

== Early life ==
Born in Springfield near Ringarooma, Tasmania, he was the seventh son of Alfred Gaby, a farmer, and his wife Adelaide, née Whiteway. While working on the family farm, he joined the militia and served for three years with the 12th Infantry Battalion (Launceston Regiment). Two of his brothers had served overseas during the Second Boer War.

== Military service ==
Gaby was labouring in Katanning, Western Australia, when he enlisted in the Australian Imperial Force (AIF) in January 1916. He had been twice previously rejected for enlistment. He embarked from Fremantle on board HMAT A38 Ulysses in April 1916, and was assigned to the 28th Battalion – an infantry battalion that was formed mainly from Western Australian recruits, which was assigned to the 7th Brigade, 2nd Division – as part of the unit's tenth draft of reinforcements. Over the course of the next twelve months while in the frontline on the Western Front, he was promoted through the ranks at a rapid speed, reaching sergeant before being selected for officer training in the United Kingdom. He was commissioned as a second lieutenant in April 1917 and graduated from the course in May. Further promotion came in September when he made lieutenant. On 29 October, Gaby was gassed during the 28th Battalion's involvement in the Battle of Passchendaele.

=== Victoria Cross details ===
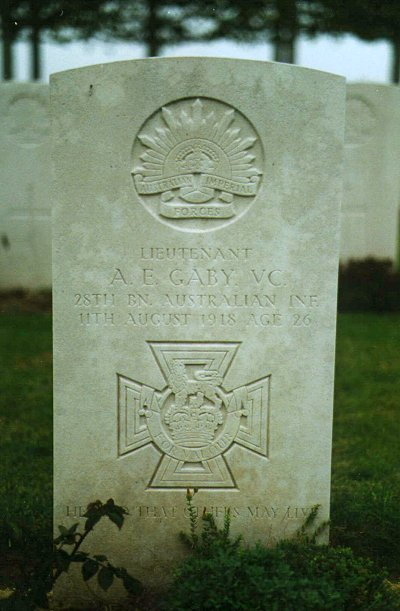
Alfred Gaby's grave in Heath Cemetery, Harbonnieres, France

Gaby was a 26-year-old lieutenant when the following deed took place for which he was awarded the Victoria Cross (VC). On 8 August 1918, at the start of the Allied Hundred Days Offensive, Gaby was acting as commander of his battalion's 'D' Company, which was committed to an attack around Villers-Bretonneux, France, during the Battle of Amiens. When the advance was checked by a large German force about 40 yards beyond the wire, Gaby found a gap and approached the strong point under heavy machine-gun and rifle fire. He emptied his revolver into the garrison, drove the crews from their guns and captured 50 prisoners and four machine-guns. Three days later, on 11 August 1918 while leading his men during an attack at Lihons, he was killed.

His VC citation from the London Gazette of 30 October 1918 reads:

For most conspicuous bravery and dash in attack, when on reaching a wire in front of an enemy trench, strong opposition was encountered. The advance was at once checked the enemy being in force about 40 yards beyond the wire, and commanding the gap with machine guns and rifles. Lieutenant Gaby found another gap in the wire, and, single handed, approached the strong point while machine guns and rifles were still being fired from it. Running along the parapet, still alone, and at point blank range, he emptied his revolver into the garrison, drove the crews from their guns, and compelled the surrender of 50 of the enemy with four machine guns. He then quickly reorganized his men, and led them on to his final objective, which he captured and consolidated. Three days later, during an attack, this officer again led his company with great dash to the objective. The enemy brought heavy rifle and machine gun fire to bear upon the line, but in the face of this heavy fire Lieutenant Gaby walked along his line of posts, encouraging his men to quickly consolidate. While engaged on this duty he was killed by an enemy sniper.

He is buried at the Heath Cemetery in Harbonnieres, France. He was unmarried at the time of his death. The Alfred Gaby ward at the former Repatriation General Hospital, Hollywood was named in his honour.
