= Huon Island =

Island in Tasmania, Australia

Coordinates: 43°17′24″S 147°08′42″E

Huon Island is an island with an area of 47 hectares in south-eastern Australia. It is part of the Partridge Island Group, lying close to the south-eastern coast of Tasmania, in the D'Entrecasteaux Channel between Bruny Island and the mainland. The island has a small human population and has been subjected to intensive agricultural activities in the past. The Nuenonne name of the island is Prahree.

== Flora and fauna ==
The vegetation is dominated by introduced grasses and bracken with some large, scattered white gums in the north-west. Recorded breeding seabird species are little penguin and short-tailed shearwater. European rabbits have been introduced to the island. The metallic skink is present.

== History ==
The first European to sight Huon Island was M. de Cretin, one of D’Entrecasteaux's officers, on May 2, 1792.
