= Percy Cherry =

Australian recipient of the Victoria Cross

Percy Herbert Cherry VC MC
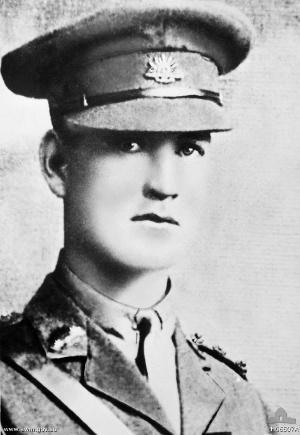
- Percy Cherry c. 1916
- Born: 4 June 1895; Drysdale, Victoria, Australia
- Died: 27 March 1917 (aged 21); Lagnicourt, France
- Burial place: Quéant Road Cemetery
- Military career
- Allegiance: Australia
- Branch: Citizen Military Forces (1913–15); Australian Imperial Force (1915–17)
- Service years: 1913–17
- Rank: Captain
- Units: 26th Battalion (1915–17)
- Conflicts: First World War; Gallipoli Campaign (WIA); Western Front; Battle of the Somme; Battle of Pozières (WIA); Battle of Arras †
- Awards: Victoria Cross; Military Cross

Percy Herbert Cherry, VC, MC (4 June 1895 – 27 March 1917) was an Australian recipient of the Victoria Cross, the highest decoration for gallantry "in the face of the enemy" that can be awarded to members of the British and Commonwealth armed forces. The award was granted posthumously for Cherry's actions during an attack on the French village of Lagnicourt which was strongly defended by German forces.

Born in the Australian state of Victoria, Cherry moved to Tasmania at the age of seven when his family took up an apple orchard. Becoming an expert apple packer, he was also a skilled rifle shot and member of the Franklin rowing club. In 1913, he was commissioned as a second lieutenant in the 93rd Infantry Regiment, Citizen Military Forces, and served as a drill instructor at the outbreak of war. Enlisting in the Australian Imperial Force in March 1915, he served at Gallipoli before transferring to the Western Front and fighting in the Battle of the Somme. In early March 1917 during the Battle of Arras, Cherry was decorated with the Military Cross following an attack on Malt Trench, in which he led a party in capturing two German machine gun posts. He was killed by a German shell the day following his Victoria Cross action.

== Early life ==
Cherry was born on 4 June 1895 at Drysdale, Victoria, to John Gawley Cherry and his wife Elizabeth, née Russel. When he was seven years old, the family moved to Tasmania and took up an apple orchard near Cradoc. Cherry attended the local state school until he was thirteen, after which he received private tuition. He worked with his father and became an expert apple packer; at fourteen he won a local case-making competition at the Launceston Fruit Show by packing thirty-five cases of apples in an hour. Joining the Australian Army Cadets in 1908, Cherry soon became a sergeant and later a second lieutenant, where he used to drill cadets in four different districts. At the age of sixteen, he won the President's Trophy and Gold Medal for being the best shot at the rifle range in Franklin. He also rowed with the Franklin rowing club, played the cornet in the Franklin brass band and sang in the Anglican church choir. In 1913, Cherry joined the Citizen Military Forces and was commissioned into the 93rd Infantry Regiment as a second lieutenant.

== First World War ==
=== Enlistment, March 1915 to Western Front, March 1917 ===
At the outbreak of war, Cherry was sent to Claremont Camp and assumed duties as a drill instructor. On 5 March 1915, he enlisted in the Australian Imperial Force and was allotted to the 26th Battalion, where he qualified as an infantry officer, but was considered too young for a commission in the Australian Imperial Force and was instead made a Quartermaster Sergeant. On 29 June, the battalion embarked from Brisbane for Egypt with Cherry aboard HMAT Aeneas. On arrival, the battalion spent several months training in the desert, where Cherry was promoted to company sergeant major in August. On 12 September, the battalion landed at Gallipoli and played a defensive role at Courtney’s and Steele’s Posts, and Russell’s Top.

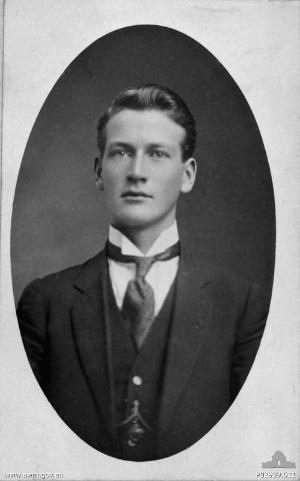
Studio portrait of Cherry while recovering from wounds in London.

On 1 December, injured by bomb wounds to his face and head, Cherry was evacuated to Egypt, where he was commissioned as a second lieutenant on 9 December. Three days later, the 26th Battalion was withdrawn from Gallipoli and evacuated to Egypt where Cherry rejoined them in preparation for service on the Western Front. Remaining in Egypt during this time, Cherry was selected to attend a machine gun course in March 1916. After completion of this, he was transferred to the 7th Machine Gun Company in France.

He commanded the company's 1st Battery at Fleurbaix, Messines and on the Somme until 5 August, when he was wounded in a duel with a German officer at Pozières. He and a German officer—who was leading an attack against Cherry's position—were exchanging shots from neighbouring shell-holes. Eventually, they both rose, firing simultaneously. The German officer hit Cherry in the neck but was mortally wounded by Cherry in return. Cherry approached the dying man, who pulled a package of letters from his pocket, and asked Cherry to have them censored and posted. Cherry promised to do so and the German handed over the letters, with the words; "And so it ends". He died shortly afterwards. As a result of his wounds, Cherry was evacuated to England for treatment.

Promoted to lieutenant on 25 August 1916, Cherry returned to his unit on the Somme in November. The following month he was made a temporary captain and transferred back to the 26th Battalion as the commanding officer of C Company. His rank was confirmed on 14 February 1917, and on 1–2 March he was involved in the battalion's actions around the village of Warlencourt. At 03:00 on 2 March, Cherry led his company in an attack on the German held position of Malt Trench, situated between the villages of Warlencourt and Bapaume. Artillery fire had failed to adequately cut the barbed wire lines for the advancing troops, and Cherry led a section of men along the wire until he found a break in it. Once through the gap, he rushed two machine gun posts, capturing one single-handed, and turned one on the fleeing Germans before being wounded himself. For his actions during the engagement, Cherry was awarded the Military Cross, the notification of which was published in a supplement of the London Gazette on 26 April 1917.

=== Victoria Cross ===
On 26 March 1917, the 7th Brigade—of which the 26th Battalion was part—was tasked with the capture of Lagnicourt as part of the Battle of Arras. It was during this engagement where Cherry was to earn the Victoria Cross. An artillery barrage opened up on the village at 05:15 and continued for twenty minutes, allowing the infantry to close in. The plan was that Cherry's company would storm the village itself while the battalion's other companies encircled it. For the assault, Cherry split his company into two sections; he commanded one section himself and placed the other under Lieutenant William Frederick Joseph Hamilton.

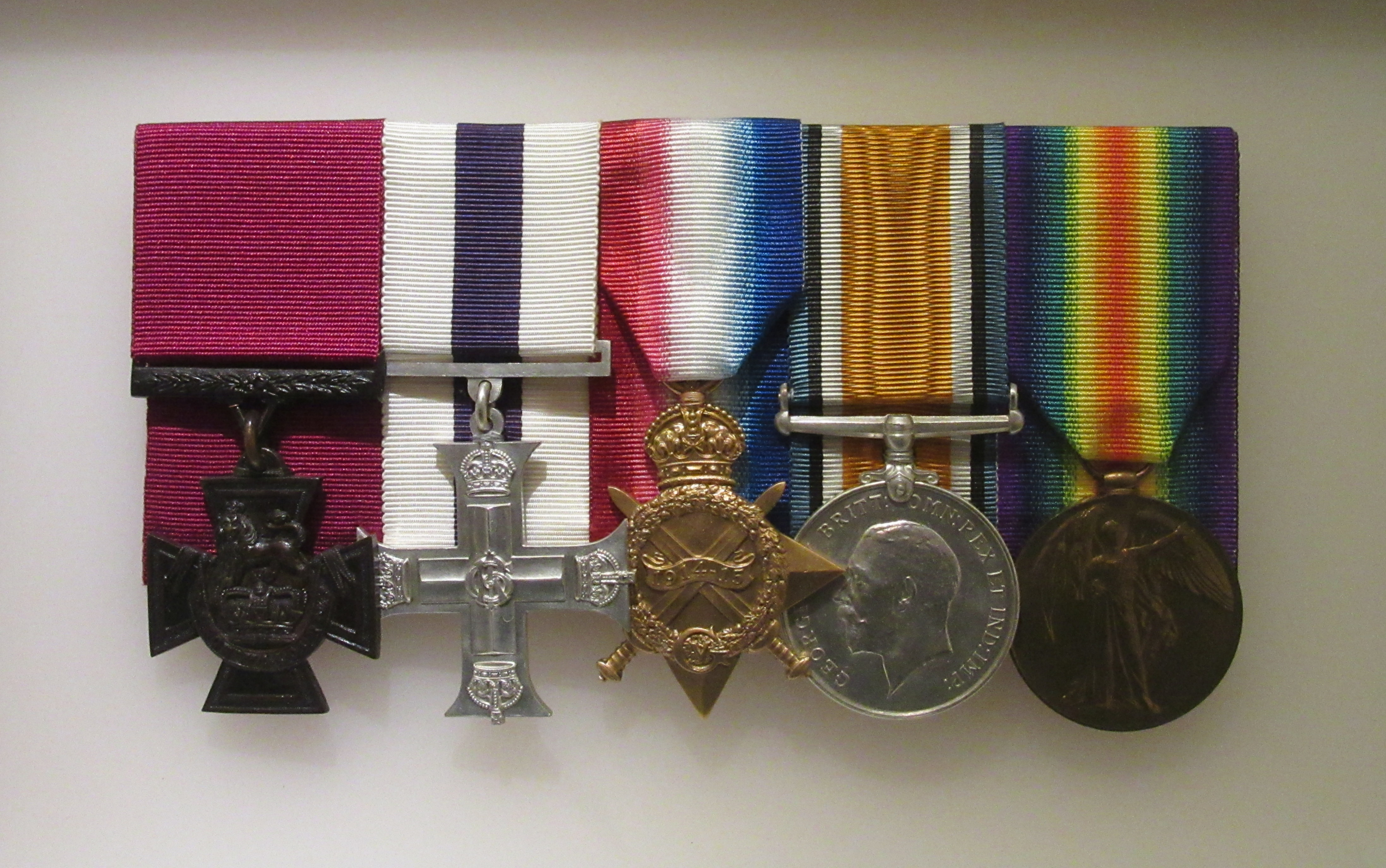
Percy Cherry's medals on display at the Australian War Memorial, Canberra

The company was soon in action. Cherry's section captured a large fortified farm on the edge of the village. As they entered the muddy main street, the Australians came under heavy fire from the houses lining the road and from an adjacent stable yard. Cherry "rushed the stable yard" and a fierce firefight developed, before the Germans surrendered. As Cherry and his men moved through Lagnicourt, they found the main resistance coming from a large chalky crater, "spotted with white chalk", at the crossroads in the village centre. The Germans' stout defence was holding up the advance and Cherry sent a messenger back for more Stokes mortars. Becoming impatient at the delay, Cherry decided to rush the position under the cover of Lewis Gun and rifle grenade fire. Capturing the crater, he found Lieutenant Harold Hereward Bieske at the bottom wounded. Bieske had taken over command of the second section when Lieutenant Hamilton was wounded, and it had now been reduced to six men.

After capturing the crater, Cherry pushed on through the village, where his party emerged from among the buildings on the far side. Another stiff fight ensured with a group of Germans in dug-outs by the side of the road, before the company was able to meet up with its fellow units which had bypassed the village and were already established to the north and east of the area. Cherry's orders were to fall back into reserve, but he disregarded them as he sensed a counter-attack was forthcoming. At 09:00 on 27 March, the Germans launched a very strong counter-attack under heavy artillery fire. At one point, Cherry noticed that the Germans were firing yellow flares to pinpoint Australian positions to their gunners. He found some of these flares, and fired them away from his position. The German attempts to retake Lagnicourt—at a cost to the 7th Brigade of 377 casualties—raged all day before they abandoned the counterattack.

=== Death and legacy ===
In the afternoon of 27 March 1917, a shell burst in a sunken road to the east of Lagnicourt, killing Cherry and several other men. He was buried in Quéant Road Cemetery, Buissy, Plot VIII, Row C, Grave 10. The full citation for Cherry's posthumous award of the Victoria Cross appeared in a supplement to the London Gazette on 11 May 1917, reading:

War Office, 11th May, 1917

His Majesty the KING has been graciously pleased to approve of the award of the Victoria Cross to the undermentioned Officers and Man:—

2nd Lt. (temp. Capt.) Percy Herbert Cherry, M.C., late Aus. Imp. Force.

For most conspicuous bravery, determination and leadership when in command of a company detailed to storm and clear a village.

After all the officers of his company had become casualties he carried on with care and determination, in the face of fierce opposition, and cleared the village of the enemy.

He sent frequent reports of progress made, and when held up for some time by an enemy strong point he organised machine gun and bomb parties and captured the position. His leadership, coolness and bravery set a wonderful example to his men.

Having cleared the village, he took charge of the situation and beat off the most resolute and heavy counter-attacks made by the enemy.

Wounded about 6.30 a.m., he refused to leave his post, and there remained, encouraging all to hold out at all costs, until, about 4.30 p.m., this very gallant officer was killed by an enemy shell.

Cherry's Victoria Cross was presented to his father by the Governor of Tasmania, Sir Francis Newdegate, in Hobart during October 1917. In 1932, a photograph of Cherry was unveiled at the headquarters of the 26th Battalion, Australian Imperial Force, at Annerley, Brisbane. His Victoria Cross is currently on display at the Australian War Memorial along with his other medals.
