= 2nd/17th Battalion, Royal New South Wales Regiment =

Australian Army reserve unit

- Active: 1987–present
- Country: Australia
- Branch: Australian Army
- Type: Light infantry
- Part of: 5th Brigade, 2nd Division
- Garrison/HQ: Pymble
- Mottos: Nulli Secundus (Second To None); Facta Probant (Deeds Prove)

Commanders
- Current commander: Lieutenant Colonel Tim Dawe
- Colonel Commandant: Major General Paul Brereton AM RFD
- Colonel of the Regiment: Her Excellency the Honourable Margaret Beazley AC KC, Governor of New South Wales

Insignia
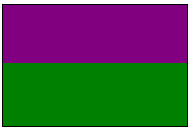
- Unit colour patch

The 2nd/17th Battalion, Royal New South Wales Regiment (2/17 RNSWR) is a reserve infantry battalion of the Australian Army. Currently part of the 5th Brigade, attached to the 2nd Division, the unit currently consists of a headquarters, signals platoon and three rifle companies spread out across a number of depots throughout the state of New South Wales. The unit was formed in 1987, following a reorganisation of the Australian Army Reserve which saw the amalgamation of a number of Reserve units across Australia. Through the 2nd Battalion and the 17th Battalion, the unit can trace its lineage back to 1860 and today it carries battle honours from both of these units, as well as the units of the Second Australian Imperial Force which fought during World War II.

== History ==
The 2nd/17th Battalion, Royal New South Wales Regiment was formed on 5 December 1987 when the 2nd and 17th Battalions were amalgamated during a ceremony held at Newcastle, New South Wales. This was part of a re-organisation of the Royal New South Wales Regiment that took place at the time, which saw two battalions in each brigade linked to respond to the declining size of a number of units.

Upon formation, the battalion was assigned to the 8th Brigade, and allocated a recruitment area that stretched from the centre of Sydney to the New South Wales Central Coast. At this time also, the battalion adopted the battle honours and traditions of its predecessor units, perpetuating a lineage that can be traced as far back as 1860, and includes active service in the Mahdist War, the Boer War, World War I and World War II.

In 1988, the newly formed battalion marched through the municipality of Ku-ring-gai, after it was granted the Freedom of Entry to the town. In 1990, 2/17 RNSWR was called upon to provide disaster relief in the wake of Newcastle earthquake and the Nyngan floods. Following this, the battalion was relocated to Silverwater, New South Wales while Suakin Depot was being refurbished. The battalion did not return until 13 April 1996, when they once again marched through Ku-ring-gai and returned to Suakin, taking up residence along with the 7th Field Regiment, Royal Australian Artillery.

In July 1994, as a result of a re-organisation of the 2nd Division, two of the battalion's rifle companies—those based at Orange and Bathurst—were transferred to the 1st/19th Battalion, Royal New South Wales Regiment. At the same time, the battalion gained a company that was based at Arncliffe from the 4th/3rd Battalion, Royal New South Wales Regiment. In 1997, as a result of a re-organisation of the Ready Reserve Scheme, the battalion gained a company (designated 'D' Company) from the 6th Brigade, although in 2000 this company was relocated to Blacktown. The previous year, 'B' Company was moved to Erina.

Throughout the late 1990s, 2/17 RNSWR took part in a number of large-scale exercises. These included Kangaroo '95, which was a multinational exercise that was undertaken in northern Australia. Later, in 1997, the battalion took part in a brigade-level exercise at Broken Hill along with units from the South Australian-based 9th Brigade, while a company was sent to the Battle Wing at Canungra, Queensland.

In June 2013 Alpha Company "Scottish" moved into the Dee Why Multi User Depot to take ownership from 7th Field Regiment.

The unit has contributed individuals, sections or platoons to operations including Rifle Company Butterworth, Solomon Islands, East Timor, Transit Security Element, Task Group Taji and Task Group Afghanistan. The battalion is currently part of the 5th Brigade.

In 2020, Soldiers from across the Battalion were called-out/for to deploy on OP BUSHFIRES ASSIST 19–20. Members of 2/17 RNSWR have also subsequently been deployed on OP COVID-19 Assist. With many soldiers deployed to Transit Security Element OP RESOLUTE. This was again repeated during 2021 to early 2022.

== Current structure ==
The 2nd/17th Battalion is currently located across the following depots:

- Regimental Headquarters: Pymble
- Signals Platoon: Pymble
- A Company: Dee Why (Headquarters) and Pymble.
- C Company: Adamstown (Headquarters) and Erina.
- D Company: Blacktown (Headquarters) and Orchard Hills

== Kilted company ==
A Company traces its lineage to the NSW Scottish Rifles unit which was affiliated with the Black Watch (the Royal Highland Regiment).

A Company continues as one of five (5) infantry companies across the Army Reserve with an entitlement to wear Scottish Dress on ceremonial occasions and significant events.

Qualified A Company infantry soldiers are entitled to wear Black Watch (Government) Tartan and the infamous Red Hackle.

== Battle honours ==
2/17 RNSWR carries the following battle honours, which it inherited from its ancestral units:

- Suakin: Sudan 1885 (The oldest Australian Army battle honour);
- Boer War: South Africa 1899–1902;
- World War I: Somme 1916 & 1918, Pozieres, Bapaume 1917, Bullecourt, Ypres 1917, Menin Road, Polygon Wood, Broodseinde, Poelcappelle, Passchendaele, Hamel, Amiens, Albert 1918, Monte St Quentin, Hindenburg Line, Beaurevoir, France and Flanders 1916–18, Suvla, Gallipoli 1915, and Egypt 1915–16;
- World War II: North Africa 1941–42, Defence of Tobruk, El Adem Road, Alam El Halfa, El Alamein, South West Pacific 1943–45, Lae–Nadzab, Finschhafen, Scarlet Beach, Defence of Scarlet Beach, Jivenaneng–Kumawa, Liberation of Australian New Guinea, Sio, Borneo, Bruinei and Miri.

== Commanding officers ==
The following is a list of officers that have served as 2/17 RNSWR's commanding officer:

- Lieutenant Colonel Lyal A. Wood, AM RFD (1987–1989);
- Lieutenant Colonel Andrew S. Morrison, RFD (1989–1991);
- Lieutenant Colonel Donald D. Shearman, RFD (1991–1994);
- Lieutenant Colonel Glen N. Oakley (1994–1996);
- Lieutenant Colonel Alan J. Henderson, RFD (1997–1998);
- Lieutenant Colonel Kim R. Turner, RFD (1999–2001);
- Lieutenant Colonel Charles A.H. Knight (2001–2002);
- Lieutenant Colonel Paul T. Blood, AM (2003–2004);
- Lieutenant Colonel Peter J. Connor, AM (2005–2006);
- Lieutenant Colonel David J. Cochrane (2007–2008);
- Lieutenant Colonel Peter J. Woodward (2009–2011);
- Lieutenant Colonel Steve A. Brumby (2012–13);
- Lieutenant Colonel James A. McGann, CSC (2014–2016);
- Lieutenant Colonel Garren A. Hamilton (2017–2018);
- Lieutenant Colonel Geoff Costello (2019–2022);
- Lieutenant Colonel Andrew Kfoury (2022–2023);
- Lieutenant Colonel Tim Dawe (2024–2025);
- Lieutenant Colonel Simon Roeder (2026– ).

== Regimental Sergeant Majors ==
The following is a list of senior NCO's that have served as 2/17 RNSWR's RSM:

- Warrant Officer Class 1 Peter Johnson (1992–1993)
- Warrant Officer Class 1 Mark Harris (2019–2021)
- Warrant Officer Class 1 Peter Sheehy (2021–2022)
- Warrant Officer Class 1 Daniel Kerwin (2023–2024)

== Alliances ==
See Royal New South Wales Regiment
