= Royal New South Wales Regiment =

The Royal New South Wales Regiment
- Cap badge of the Royal New South Wales Regiment
- Active: 1 July 1960–Present
- Country: Australia
- Branch: Army
- Type: Infantry
- Size: Four battalions
- Part of: Royal Australian Infantry Corps
- Motto: Primus in Terra Australi (First in Australia)

Commanders
- Colonel Commandant: Major General Paul Brereton
- Colonel of the Regiment: Margaret Beazley, Governor of New South Wales

Insignia
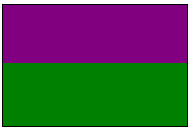
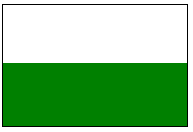
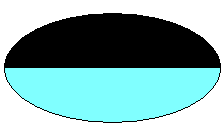
- Unit colour patch
- Abbreviation: RNSWR

The Royal New South Wales Regiment (RNSWR) is a reserve infantry regiment of the Australian Army based in the state of New South Wales.

== Organisation ==
The regiment currently consists of four battalions:

- 1st/19th Battalion;
- 2nd/17th Battalion;
- 4th/3rd Battalion;
- 41st Battalion.

Along with these battalions, the regiment's history includes a number of other units that have been removed from the Australian Army's order of battle. These include: the 1st, 2nd, 3rd, 4th, 13th, 17th, 18th, 19th, 20th, 30th, 33rd, 34th, 35th, 36th, 45th, 53rd, 54th, 55th and 56th Battalions and their associated Second Australian Imperial Force battalions. In addition, through the process of re-roling, the several light horse, armoured or cavalry units have also contributed to the regiment's history such as the 6th New South Wales Mounted Rifles, the 6th Light Horse and the 6th Armoured Regiment.

== History ==
The regiment was formed in 1960 as a result the amalgamation of all the Citizen's Military Force infantry battalions in New South Wales. This came about through an Army-wide reorganisation of regionally based infantry battalions and the formation of multi-battalion state-based regiments. The New South Wales Regiment was formed from ten individual regiments:

- City of Sydney's Own Regiment
- New South Wales Scottish Regiment
- North Shore Regiment
- Newcastle Regiment
- Macquarie Regiment
- 6th New South Wales Mounted Rifles
- St George Regiment
- Illawarra Regiment
- Werriwa Regiment
- Australian Rifles

At the same time that state-based regiments were introduced, the Army also adopted the Pentropic establishment. This required larger battalions, formed with five companies, and as a result the reorganisation saw the previously existing battalions become company-sized elements of the new Pentropically organised battalions. This resulted in a large reduction in the number of New South Wales battalions, falling from 13 to just three. The 1st Battalion (Commando) was formed from the 1st Infantry Battalion (City of Sydney's Own Regiment), which was the only unit transferred intact to a new state regiment. The 2nd and 3rd Battalions were formed through the amalgamation of the remaining battalions, which were reduced to company-size.

When the Army moved away from the Pentropic organisation in 1965 and the national service scheme began, there was an expansion of the reserve force and this saw a further three battalions being raised (the 4th, 17th, 41st), with the 19th Battalion formed in 1966 as a remote area battalion. A year after that, the 1st Battalion was reduced to a company, which was amalgamated with the 19th Battalion in 1971. Further amalgamations in 1987 led to the formation of the regiment as it is today. Today, the regiment provides two battalions each to 5th Brigade and 8th Brigade in 2nd Division.

== Alliances ==
The regiment maintains the following alliances:

- United Kingdom – The Royal Marines
- United Kingdom – 3rd Battalion, The Black Watch
- United Kingdom – 5th Battalion, The Argyll and Sutherland Highlanders
- United Kingdom – The Princess of Wales's Royal Regiment (Queen's and Royal Hampshires)
- United Kingdom – The Royal Welsh
- United Kingdom – The Rifles
- Canada – Royal Newfoundland Regiment

== Battle honours ==
The regiment has been awarded a total of 117 battle honours. These come through the regiment's historical predecessors that served in the Mahdist War, the Boer War, the First World War and the Second World War. The first battle honour received was "Suakin 1885", which was awarded to regiment due to the commitment of a 767-strong New South Wales force consisting of four infantry companies, artillery, and a field ambulance. The next battle honour, "South Africa 1899–1902" was awarded to several units based on the participation of their members in various New South Wales contingents. During the First World War, a total of 47 battle honours were awarded. The 1st and 2nd Battalions received a unique battle honour, "Herbertshohe", as they were formed from personnel who had previously served in the Australian Naval and Military Expeditionary Force that fought in German New Guinea. The remaining 68 battle honours were awarded for the Second World War.
