= 18th Battalion (Australia) =

Australian Army infantry battalion

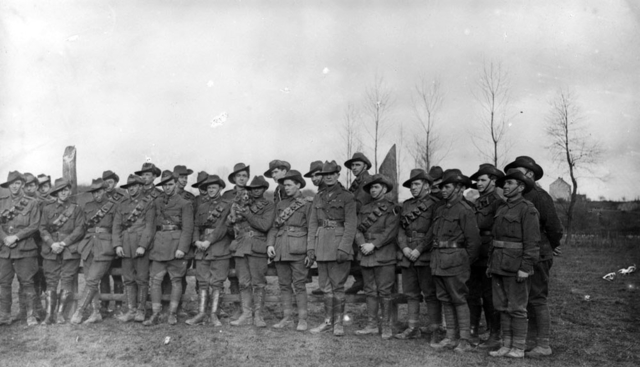
- Members of the 18th Battalion in France, c. 1916–1918
- Active: 1915–1919; 1921–1935; 1936–1944
- Country: Australia
- Branch: Australian Army
- Type: Infantry
- Size: ~800–1,000 men (Note: During World War I, the authorised strength of an Australian infantry battalion was 1,023 men. By the start of World War II, it was 910 men all ranks, however, later in the war it fell to 803.)
- Part of: 5th Brigade, 2nd Division
- Colours: Purple over green
- Engagements: World War I: Gallipoli campaign; Western Front

Commanders
- Notable commanders: Evan Alexander Wisdom

Insignia
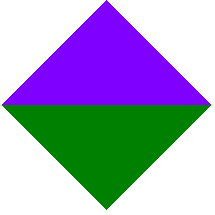
- Unit colour patch

The 18th Battalion was an infantry battalion of the Australian Army. During World War I, the battalion was raised in 1915 as part of the Australian Imperial Force, attached to the 5th Brigade, of the 2nd Division. It was sent initially to Gallipoli, where it suffered many casualties before it was withdrawn from the line and sent to France and Belgium, where it served at the Western Front as part of the Australian Corps and took part in most of the major battles between 1916 and 1918. The battalion's last engagement of the war was at Montbrehain in October 1918 and it was disbanded in April 1919.

After the war, the battalion was re-raised as a part-time force in the Sydney area. It was briefly amalgamated with the 51st Battalion in 1935–1936, but the two units were later unlinked and re-raised as separate units. During World War II, the battalion served in a garrison role in Australia and was disbanded in 1944 without having seen active service overseas.

== History ==
=== World War I ===
Raised as an Australian Imperial Force (AIF) battalion in March 1915 as part of the 5th Brigade of the 2nd Division, the 18th Battalion was formed at Liverpool, New South Wales. Following training, the battalion was sent to Egypt, and from there to Gallipoli in August 1915 as part of a wave of reinforcements that arrived after the initial landing. There it participated in the costly August Offensive, during which it was sent to Damakjelik Bair. From there, they played a mainly defensive role in the campaign, apart from playing a minor role in the attack on Hill 60, Beginning the battle with about 1,000 men, by the end the battalion could muster only 386. Following that, the battalion was placed in reserve behind the 5th Brigade's positions between Walker's Ridge and Quinn's Post, until they were withdrawn in December 1915. Their main area of responsibility during this time was Courtney's Post.

After returning to Egypt, the AIF underwent a period of reorganisation as it was expanded from two infantry divisions to five prior to their transfer to Europe. As the battalion was rebuilt, further training was undertaken before it was sent to France, arriving there in late March 1916. For the next two-and-a-half years they participated in most of the main battles fought by the Australians on the Western Front. Their first major action came at Pozières in mid-1916 as part of the wider Battle of the Somme, being committed twice in July and August. In late August, the 18th was withdrawn to Belgium to recover, before returning to the Somme in October. For the rest of 1916, the battalion undertook defensive duties along the front, although they were not involved in any major attacks. The following year, the Germans shortened their lines and withdrew to the Hindenburg Line, after which the 18th Battalion took part in the fighting around Warlencourt in February 1917 as the Allies sought to follow up the German withdrawal. A brief advance followed before they came up against the forward positions of the Hindenburg Line. In May, the 18th Battalion was committed to the Second Battle of Bullecourt before moving again to Belgium where they saw further action around the Ypres Salient at Menin Road in September and Poelcappelle in October before settling down for the winter.

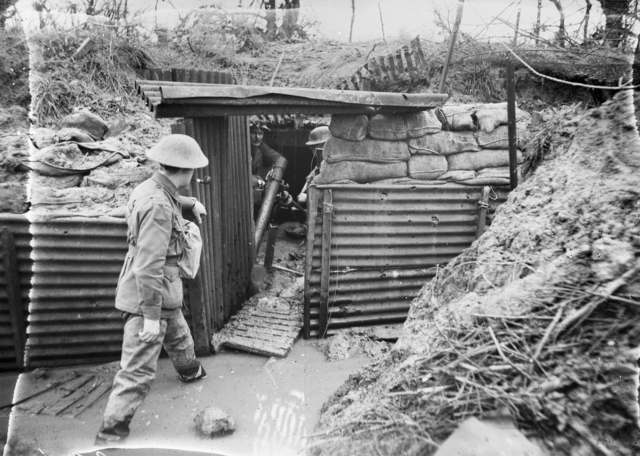
A Stokes mortar from the 18th Battalion in action near Ploegsteert, January 1918

In early 1918, following the collapse of the Russian resistance on the Eastern Front, the Germans had been able to transfer many troops to the Western Front. (Note: At 30 November 1917, there were 160 German divisions on the Western Front. Following the Treaty of Brest-Litovsk, this rose to 208.) As a result, in March, they launched their German spring offensive. With the Germans making rapid gains, Australian units, including the 18th Battalion, were moved south from Belgium where they had spent the winter and they were thrown into the line to help blunt the attack around Villers-Bretonneux, which lay before the strategically important rail hub at Amiens. After this, in August the Allies were able to launch their own offensive, which subsequently became known as the Hundred Days Offensive and ultimately brought about the Armistice. During this offensive, the battalion fought at Amiens and Mont St Quentin before assaulting "Beaurevoir Line", which was the third (and final) fortified line of the Hindenburg Line. There, at Montbrehain, on 3 October 1918, Lieutenant Joseph Maxwell earned the battalion's first and only Victoria Cross in what was ultimately to prove their last engagement of the war. After this the units of the Australian Corps, severely depleted due to heavy casualties and limited reinforcements, were withdrawn from the line upon the insistence of the Australian prime minister, Billy Hughes, for rest and re-organisation and did not return to the front before the Armistice was declared on 11 November 1918.

Following the end of hostilities, the demobilisation process began and as personnel were repatriated back to Australia, the battalion's numbers dwindled until the battalion was finally disbanded on 11 April 1919, while it was still in Belgium. Throughout the course of the war, the battalion suffered 3,513 casualties, of which 1,060 were killed. Members of the battalion received the following decorations: one Victoria Cross, one Companion of the Order of St Michael and St George, five Distinguished Service Orders, 35 Distinguished Conduct Medals, 44 Military Crosses, 158 Military Medals, seven Meritorious Service Medals and 39 Mentions in Despatches. The 18th Battalion received 20 battle honours for its war service.

=== Subsequent service ===
Australia's part-time military force was re-organised in 1921 to perpetuate the numerical designations, battle honours and formations of the AIF. The 18th Battalion was re-raised in the Kuring-Gai region of Sydney, as part of the Citizens Forces, at this time drawing personnel from 17th and 18th Infantry Regiments. In 1927, when territorial designations were adopted, it assumed the title of the "Kuring-Gai Regiment". On 1 July 1935, the 18th Battalion was amalgamated with the 51st Battalion to form the 18th/51st Battalion. This lasted until 1 October 1936, when the two battalions were unlinked and re-formed as separate units.

At the outbreak of World War II, the battalion was based at Willoughby, New South Wales, where it formed part of the 8th Brigade, attached to the 1st Division within the 2nd Military District. By April 1941, the battalion formed part of the 9th Brigade. In November 1942, the battalion's machine gun company was detached and in conjunction with several other Militia machine gun companies, it was used to form the 6th Machine Gun Battalion. Throughout the war, the battalion remained in Australia, where it conducted garrison duties before being disbanded on 20 October 1944. Over the course of the war, it was assigned variously to the 8th, 9th, 28th and 1st Brigades.

Following the conclusion of the demobilisation process, Australia's part-time military force was re-raised under the guise of the Citizens Military Force in 1948. At this time, the 18th Battalion was re-raised, albeit as an amalgamated unit with the 17th Battalion to form the 17th/18th Battalion (The North Shore Regiment). In 1960, the Australian Army was reorganised along Pentropic lines, and the 17th/18th Battalion became 'B' Company, 2nd Battalion, Royal New South Wales Regiment (2 RNSWR). When the Pentropic divisional structure was abandoned in 1965, however, the 17th Battalion was reformed in its own right as the 17th Battalion, Royal New South Wales Regiment, but the 18th Battalion was not re-raised.

== Battle honours ==
The 18th battalion received the following battle honours:

- World War I: Suvla, Gallipoli 1915–16, Egypt 1915–16, Somme 1916–18, Pozières, Bapaume 1917, Bullecourt, Ypres 1917, Menin Road, Polygon Wood, Broodseinde, Poelcappelle, Passchendaele, Hamel, Amiens, Albert 1918, Mont St Quentin, Hindenburg Line, Beaurevoir, France and Flanders 1916–18.
- World War II: Malaya 1941–42, Johore, Jemaluang, Singapore Island. (Note: Entrusted to the 18th Battalion in 1961 to hold on behalf of the 2/18th Battalion.)

== Commanding officers ==
During World War I, the following officers served as commanding officer of the 18th Battalion:

- Lieutenant Colonel Alfred Ernest Chapman;
- Lieutenant Colonel Evan Alexander Wisdom, DSO; (Note: Wisdom received his DSO for actions at Gallipoli. He later achieved the rank of brigadier general.)
- Lieutenant Colonel George Francis Murphy.

During World War II, the following officers commanded the 18th Battalion:

- Lieutenant Colonel Claude Ewen Cameron;
- Lieutenant Colonel Garnet Ingamells Adcock;
- Lieutenant Colonel Clive Henry Neville.

== Notes ==
Footnotes

Citations
