= Paul Brereton =

Australian military personnel

Paul Le Gay Brereton
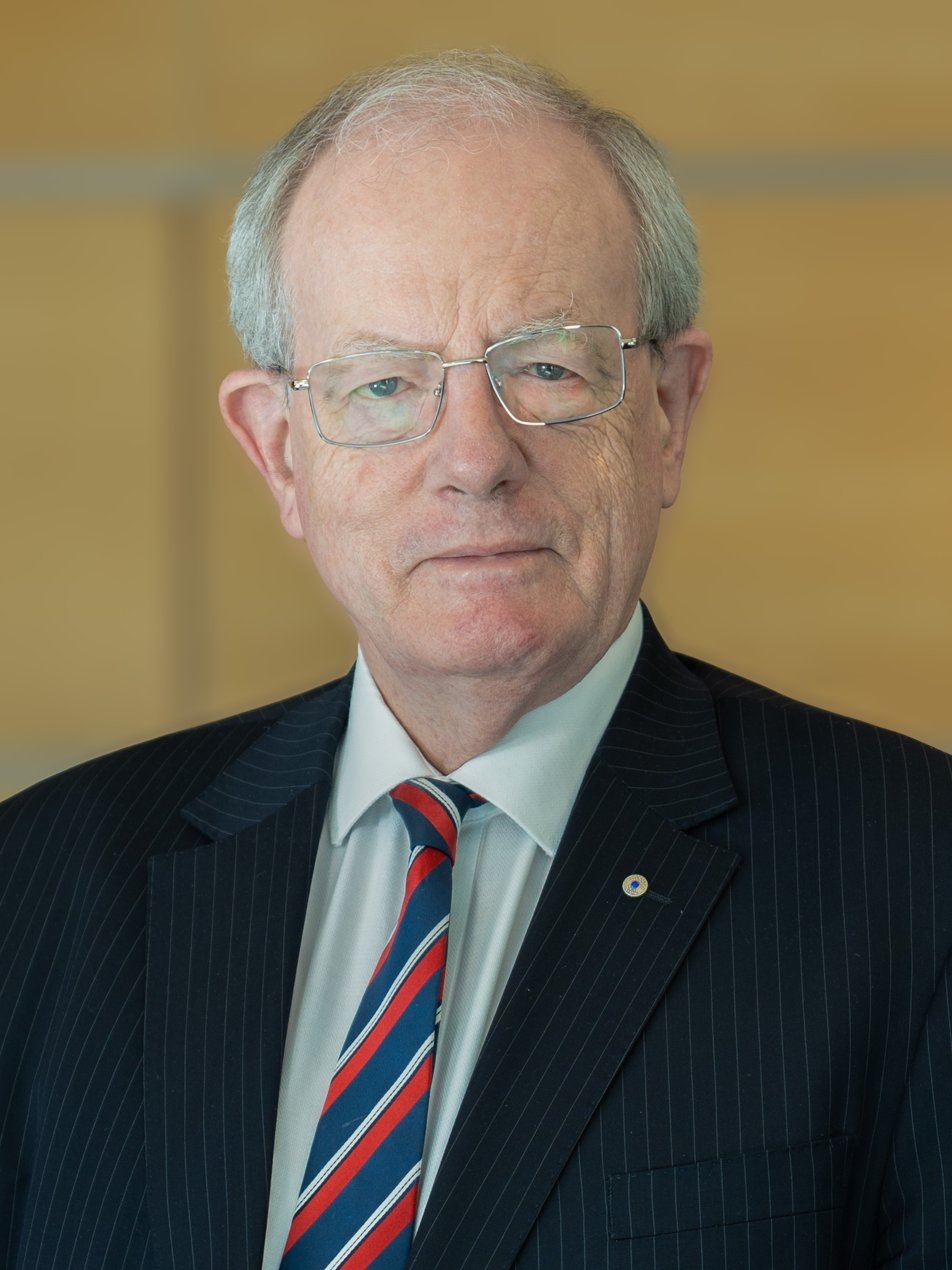
- Born: 17 August 1957 (age 69); North Sydney, New South Wales
- Military career
- Allegiance: Australia
- Branch: Australian Army Reserve
- Service years: 1975–present
- Rank: Major General
- Commands: Cadet, Reserve and Employer Support Division (2010–14); 5th Brigade (2008–10); 4th/3rd Battalion, Royal New South Wales Regiment (1997–99)
- Awards: Member of the Order of Australia; Reserve Force Decoration

Major General Paul Le Gay Brereton, AM, RFD (born 27 August 1957) is an army reservist and legal professional.

Born in North Sydney and later enlisting in the Australian Army Reserve in 1975, Brereton held various roles including with the Royal Australian Infantry Corps and as a commanding Officer of the New South Wales Regiment.

Brereton also has a lengthy legal career, graduating with a Bachelor of Laws in 1982, and later being appointed as a Judge in the Supreme Court of New South Wales in 2005. He was later appointed to investigate alleged war crimes committed by the Australian Defence Force from 2016 to 2020, and served as inaugural Commissioner of the National Anti Corruption Commission from 2023 to 2026.

== Early life ==
Paul Brereton was born 27 August 1957 in North Sydney, New South Wales. His father, Russell Brereton (1911–1974), saw military service during the Second World War in the Middle East, New Guinea and Borneo and was later a permanent Puisne Judge of the Supreme Court of New South Wales. Paul Brereton was educated at Knox Grammar School and the University of Sydney. Brereton graduated with a Bachelor of Arts (Honours) in 1980 and Bachelor of Laws in 1982.

== University politics ==
Brereton was actively involved in student representation at the University of Sydney. He was the Honorary Secretary/Treasurer of the University of Sydney Students' Representative Council in 1979 and the President in 1980 and 81. Brereton also served as a student representative on the Faculty of Arts, the Academic Board and as a Fellow of Senate in 1981.

== Legal career ==
That year, he was admitted as a solicitor in New South Wales and moved to Sydney, where he practised as an employed solicitor with Duncan Barron & Co until 1987. He joined the Sydney Bar and was appointed Senior Counsel in 1998. In 2005 he was sworn in as a Judge of the Supreme Court of New South Wales. He worked primarily in the Equity Division. He retired in 2023 upon assuming his role as Commissioner of the NACC.

== Army Reserve ==
Brereton enlisted in the Australian Army Reserve in 1975 and was commissioned into the Royal Australian Infantry Corps in 1979. From 1977 until 1997 he was also Training Officer of the Knox Grammar School Cadet Unit.

His senior appointments have included Second-in-command of Sydney University Regiment (1994–96), Commanding Officer of the 4th/3rd Battalion, Royal New South Wales Regiment (1997–99), and as an instructor at the Australian Command and Staff College (2000–01). He was subsequently Colonel, Reserve Policy (2003–04) and then Chief of Staff, 5th Brigade (2005–06), for which service he was awarded a Land Commander's commendation. On 1 January 2007 he was promoted brigadier and posted as Assistant Chief of Staff, Land Headquarters, and on 1 January 2008, assumed his posting as commander 5th Brigade. Brereton was promoted major general and served as Head of the Cadet, Reserve and Employer Support Division from 2010 to 2014.

== The Brereton Report ==
From 2016 to 2020, Brereton was tapped by the Inspector General of the Australian Defence Force to investigate allegations of war crimes committed by Australian forces in Afghanistan from 2005 to 2016. Commonly referred to as the Brereton Report, it found evidence of varying levels of misconduct committed by certain ADF members, including; members being either directly responsible for, or accessories to, the murders of civilians and prisoners, planting evidence on civilians killed in action to make them seem like legitimate combatants, and a culture where superiors would encourage junior soldiers to achieve their first kill. The report placed primary responsibility with patrol level commanders, with some responsibility on the senior commanders. The report generated international headlines and resulted in the establishment of the Office of the Special Investigator, to investigate criminal conduct by Australian Forces and the disestablishment of 2 Squadron of the Special Air Service Regiment.

== National Anti Corruption Commission ==
In March 2023, Brereton was appointed as the inaugural commissioner of the National Anti-Corruption Commission (NACC). The Commission's announcement on 6 June 2024, that it would not investigate the so called Robodebt Six lead to a public outcry, large enough that an Independent Investigation was authorised by Gail Furness, the NACC Inspector. On 30 October 2024, the findings of the investigation were published and concluded that Brereton as NACC Commissioner engaged in officer misconduct by not fully recusing himself from the decision making process, despite declaring a "close association" with one of the individuals referred to the NACC. Despite delegating the final decision to his deputies, the inspector found that he still maintained "comprehensive" involvement in the decision making process. The Commission would later find two instances of serious corrupt conduct on the part of two of the individuals originally referred.

On 31 October 2025, Brereton announced he would recuse himself from all defence related corruption referrals, after internal pressure by his deputies. This came after it was revealed in September that he had maintained an association with the Inspector General of the Australian Defence Force (offering advice on 21 separate occasions), and had been granted extensions to remain in the army past the mandatory retirement age. This was despite him publicly declaring that he had stepped away from the IGADF upon his appointment as NACC Commissioner. It later transpired that he was warned upon joining the NACC that he should refrain from continuing or taking new formal work for the IGADF and had been specifically asked to develop a "robust conflict of interest management plan" by the then Attorney General Mark Dreyfus. In response to the growing backlash, the Inspector of the NACC authorised a second investigation into potential maladministration or officer misconduct.

Brereton will resign from the NACC on 5 July 2026, saying "The ongoing focus on matters relating to me personally rather than the commission's work is drawing attention away from the commission's core purpose of strengthening integrity in the Commonwealth public sector, which has always been my primary focus as commissioner".

== Honours ==

Member of the Order of Australia
Reserve Force Decoration (with Federation Star)
Australian Defence Medal
Australian Cadet Forces Service Medal

Brereton was appointed a Member of the Order of Australia in the 2010 Queen's Birthday Honours for his "exceptional service to the Australian Army".
