= 6th Light Horse Regiment (Australia) =

Australian Army mounted regiment

- 6th Light Horse Regiment hat badge
- Active: 1914–1919; 1921–1943; 1949–1960
- Country: Australia
- Branch: Australian Army
- Type: Mounted infantry
- Size: Regiment
- Part of: 2nd Light Horse Brigade
- Engagements: First World War: North African Campaign; Gallipoli campaign; Sinai and Palestine Campaign

Insignia
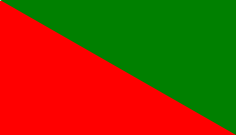
- Unit colour patch

The 6th Light Horse Regiment was a mounted infantry regiment of the Australian Army during the First World War. The regiment was raised in September 1914, and assigned to the 2nd Light Horse Brigade. The regiment fought against the forces of the German Empire and the Ottoman Empire, in Egypt, at Gallipoli, on the Sinai Peninsula, and in Palestine and Jordan. After the armistice the regiment eventually returned to Australia in March 1919. For its role in the war the regiment was awarded sixteen battle honours. During the inter-war years, the regiment was re-raised as a part-time unit based in New South Wales, adopting the designation of the "New South Wales Mounted Rifles". It was later converted to a motor regiment during the early years of the Second World War before being redesignated as an armoured car regiment. Nevertheless, it was disbanded in early 1943 without having been deployed overseas. During the post war years, the regiment was re-raised as part of the Citizens Military Force, and in 1956 was converted into an infantry unit, and in 1960 was subsumed into the Royal New South Wales Regiment.

== Formation ==
The 6th Light Horse Regiment was raised at Sydney in September 1914 as part of the all volunteer Australian Imperial Force, and comprised twenty-five officers and 497 other ranks serving in three squadrons, each of six troops. Each troop was divided into eight sections, of four men each. In action one man of each section, was nominated as a horse holder reducing the regiment's rifle strength by a quarter. Its personnel were mostly recruited from the state of New South Wales. Once formed the regiment was assigned to the 2nd Light Horse Brigade, serving alongside the 5th and 7th Light Horse Regiments.

All Australian Light Horse regiments used cavalry unit designations, but were mounted infantry armed with rifles, not swords or lances, and mounted exclusively on the Australian Waler horse. The regiment was issued a wallaby fur puggaree, which was distinctive to other units.

== Operational history ==
=== Gallipoli ===
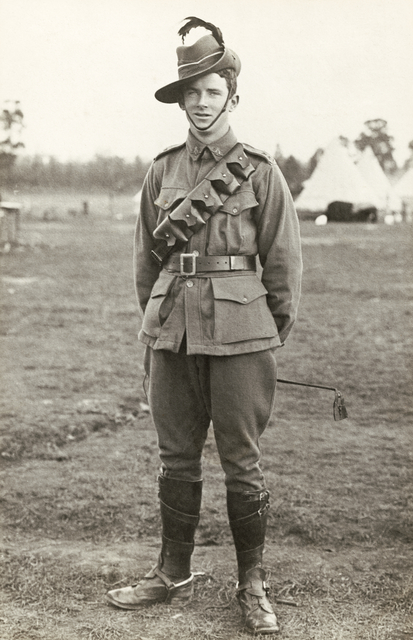
A trooper of the 6th Light Horse Regiment

In December 1914, only three months after being raised the regiment sailed for Egypt arriving on 1 February 1915. When the Australian foot infantry left Egypt to take part in the Gallipoli campaign, the light horse regiments were left behind, the authorities believing mounted troops would not be needed in the campaign. The band of the 6th Light Horse played So Long written by Australian composer May Summerbelle as the infantry sailed. However, casualties amongst the Australian infantry were so severe it was decided to send the light horsemen without their horses, as infantry reinforcements. The 6th Light Horse landed on the peninsula on 20 May 1915. They were attached to the 1st Division, and made responsible for the defence of the right flank of the Australian and New Zealand Army Corps position. During the campaign they fought mainly defensive actions around the Anzac Cove beachhead, until being withdrawn in December 1915 as part of the Allied evacuation from the peninsula.

=== Sinai and Palestine Campaign ===
On their arrival back in Egypt, the 6th Light Horse, still part of the 2nd Light Horse Brigade, were assigned to the newly formed ANZAC Mounted Division. By April 1916, they were positioned to defend the Suez Canal from an Ottoman incursion. In August, the regiment took part in the battles of Romani and Katia, following up the retreating Ottoman forces into the Sinai desert.

The regiment spent the next few months patrolling the desert, until fighting in the unsuccessful first and second battles of Gaza. This was followed by the successful battle of Beersheba in October 1917. After the battle the regiment took part in the pursuit of the Ottoman forces, which eventually resulted in the capture of Jerusalem. The 6th Light Horse then took part in an operation along the River Jordan, which ended with the capture of Aman and Es Salt. The Ottoman Empire surrendered soon after that and before returning home the regiment was sent back to Egypt to provide internal security as riots broke out there. In June 1919, the regiment sailed for Australia. Their casualties for the First World War amounted to 111 dead and 461 wounded.

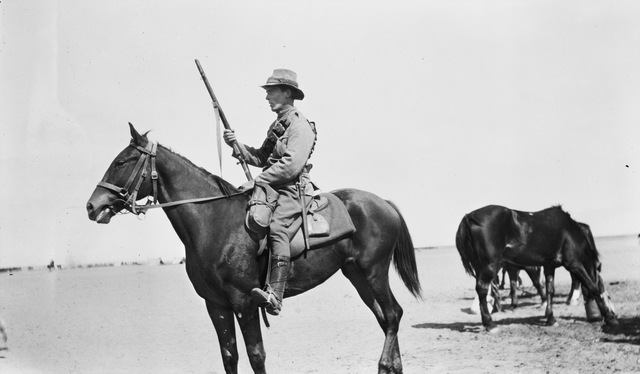
The 6th Light Horse in Palestine 1916

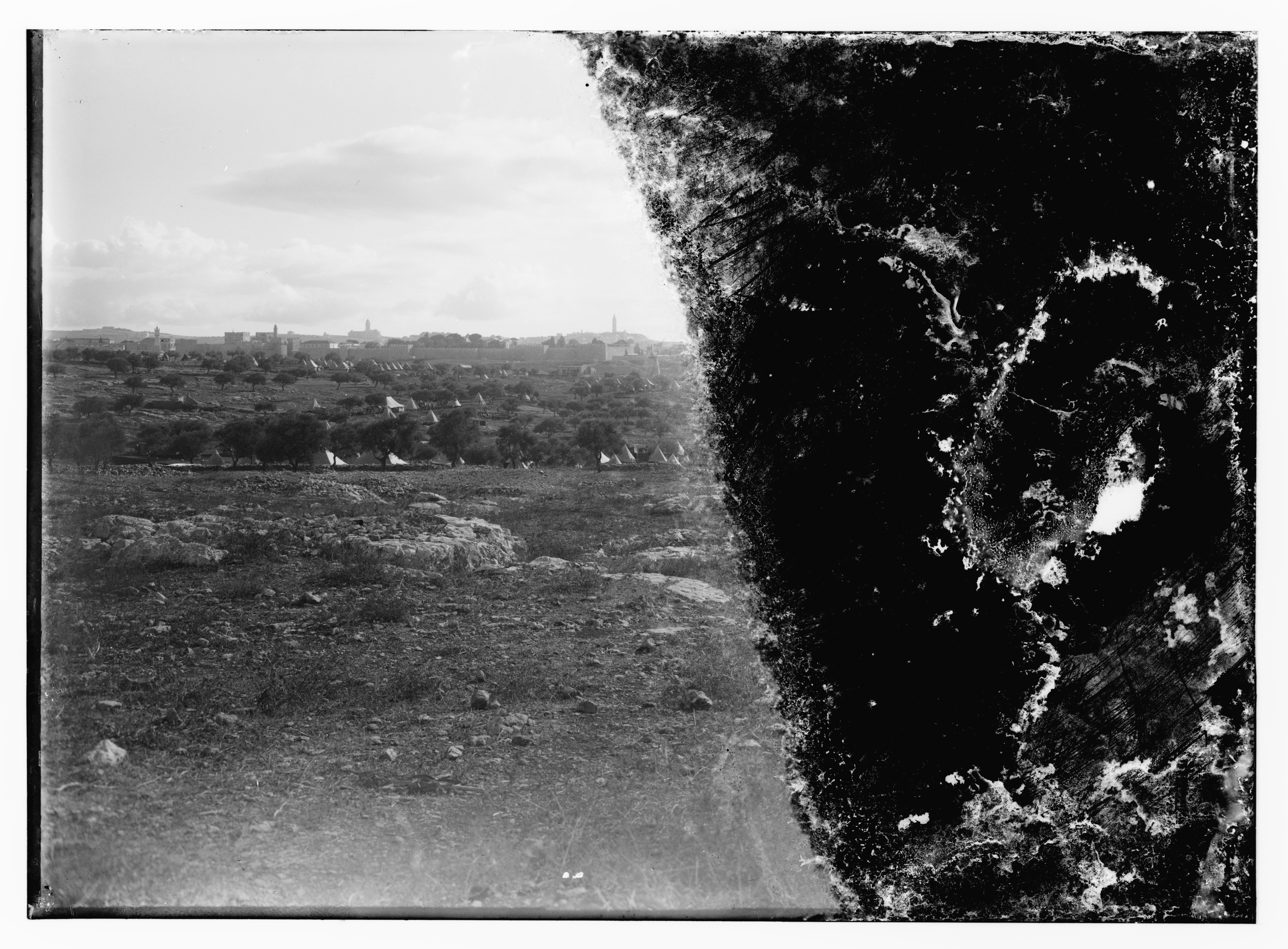
The 6th Light Horse Mount Scopus 1918

== Perpetuation ==
In 1921, Australia's part-time military forces were re-organised to perpetuate the numerical designations of the AIF following its demobilisation. Through this process, the 6th Light Horse was re-raised as a Citizens Forces unit within the 2nd Military District in the state of New South Wales, drawing lineage from the 9th Light Horse (New South Wales Mounted Rifles), which had been formed in 1912 and which traced its origins back to the 2nd Australian Light Horse Regiment (New South Wales Mounted Rifles) that had been formed in 1903 as part of the amalgamation of Australia's colonial forces into the Australian Army after Federation.

This unit remained in existence throughout the inter-war years, and at the outbreak of the war the regiment was assigned to the 6th Cavalry Brigade. In December 1941, it was converted into a motor regiment, adopting the designation of the "6th Motor Regiment (New South Wales Mounted Rifles)". In September 1942, the regiment was re-designated the "6th Australian Armoured Car Regiment". The regiment was deemed surplus to requirements and, as part of a gradual demobilisation of the Australian Army, on 19 February 1943, it was disbanded without having seen operational service during the war.

In the post war period, Australia's part-time force was re-raised and in 1949 the regiment was reformed with the designation of the "6th Motor Regiment (New South Wales Mounted Rifles)". It was corps-allocated to the Royal Australian Armoured Corps at the time, but on 1 July 1956 was re-roled as an infantry unit and transferred to the Royal Australian Infantry Corps, adopting the designation of the "6th New South Wales Mounted Rifles". In 1960, the regiment was subsumed into the Royal New South Wales Regiment, forming a company-sized element of that regiment's 2nd Battalion when it was reorganised along Pentropic lines.

== Commanding officers ==
The following officers commanded the 6th Light Horse during the First World War:

- Lieutenant Colonel Charles Frederick Cox
- Lieutenant Colonel Colin Dunmore Fuller
- Lieutenant Colonel Harold Albert Duckett White
- Lieutenant Colonel Donald Gordon Cross

== Battle honours ==
The 6th Light Horse Regiment received the following battle honours:

- ANZAC · Defence at ANZAC · Suvla · Sari Bair · Gallipoli 1915–1916 · Egypt 1915–1917 · Romani · Gaza-Beersheba · El Mughar · Nebi Samwill · Jerusalem · Jordan (Es Salt) · Jordan (Amman) · Megiddo · Nablus · Palestine 1917–1918.
