= Bede Kenny =

Thomas James Bede Kenny VC
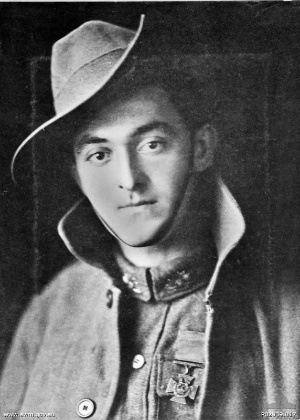
- Thomas James Bede Kenny, c. 1917.
- Born: 29 September 1896; Paddington, New South Wales
- Died: 15 April 1953 (aged 56); Concord, New South Wales
- Military career
- Allegiance: Australia
- Branch: Australian Imperial Force
- Service years: 1915–18
- Rank: Corporal
- Units: 2nd Battalion; 54th Battalion
- Conflicts: First World War; Western Front; Battle of the Somme; Battle of Pozières
- Awards: Victoria Cross
- Other work: Salesman

Thomas James Bede Kenny, VC (29 September 1896 – April 1953) was an Australian recipient of the Victoria Cross, the highest award for gallantry in the face of the enemy that can be awarded to British and Commonwealth forces.

He was 20 years old, and a private in the 2nd Battalion, Australian Imperial Force during the First World War when for his conspicuous bravery he was awarded the VC.

== Early life ==
Bede Kenny was born on 29 September 1896 at Paddington, Sydney, the son of Austin James Kenny, a butcher, from Auckland, New Zealand, and his wife Mary Christina, née Connolly, of New South Wales. He was educated at the Christian Brothers' College, Waverley.

Following matriculation from high school, he began to train as a chemist's assistant at Bondi. After just three months of training, on 23 August 1915, he enlisted in the Australian Imperial Force — a fortnight after the major Australian actions at Lone Pine and The Nek.

== First World War ==
On 20 December he embarked with the 13th Reinforcements, 2nd Battalion and, after arriving in Egypt, served with the 54th Battalion – the 2nd Battalion's daughter battalion – before joining the 2nd on 27 February 1916. In March 1916 he went to France and, in the second phase of the Battle of Pozières, fought in the battalion bombing platoon.

On 9 April 1917, at Hermies, France, Kenny's platoon was held up by an enemy strong point. Despite heavy enemy fire, he ran alone towards the enemy, killing one man who tried to stop him, and soon after bombing the enemy position. Kenny was successful in wounding and capturing the gun crew and seizing the gun. For his actions in Hermies he was awarded the Victoria Cross. His citation read:

For most conspicuous bravery and devotion to duty when his platoon was held up by an enemy strongpoint, and severe casualties prevented progress. Private Kenny, under very heavy fire at close range, dashed alone towards the enemy's position, killed one man in advance of the strongpoint who endeavoured to bar his way. He then bombed the position, captured the gun crew, all of whom he had wounded, killed an officer who showed fight, and seized the gun. Private Kenny's gallant action enabled this platoon to occupy the position, which was of great local importance.

Following this, Kenny was immediately promoted to lance corporal and soon afterwards was evacuated to England with trench-foot. He rejoined the battalion at Hazebrouck and on 26 June 1918 was wounded during fighting in the Merris sector. Despite describing his injuries as "nothing to write home about", he was invalided to Australia in August, arriving in Sydney on 9 October. He had become a corporal earlier that same month. In Sydney, Kenny rejected an offer to join the military police, whom it is said he disliked intensely, and was subsequently discharged on 12 December.

== Civilian life ==
Returning to civilian life in Australia, Kenny began working as a travelling salesman for Clifford Love & Co. (manufacturers, importers and merchants). He then joined the Sunday Times newspaper in Sydney, and shortly after became a traveller for Penfolds Wines.

On 29 September 1927, Kenny married Kathleen Dorothy Buckley, a florist, at St Mary's Cathedral; they had four children. His eldest daughter died in 1943, and his only son in 1948, both from rheumatic fever, from which it is said he never recovered.

Kenny repeatedly suffered the effects of trench-foot; the war had also made him partially deaf. Though he never talked openly of his wartime experiences, Kenny always led the VC awardees in the Sydney Anzac Day march.

== Death and legacy ==
Kenny died in Concord Repatriation General Hospital, Sydney, on 15 April 1953 and was buried in Botany cemetery. The pall bearers at his funeral were military policemen. He was survived by his wife and one of his daughters.

In 1957, the Bede Kenny Memorial Ward was opened at Wentworth Private Hospital, Randwick, to provide beds for ex-servicemen ineligible for repatriation hospital treatment.

His Victoria Cross is displayed at the Australian War Memorial.
