= 1st/19th Battalion, Royal New South Wales Regiment =

Infantry battalion of the Australian Army

- Active: 1930–1939; 1971–present
- Country: Australia
- Branch: Australian Army
- Type: Infantry
- Size: One battalion
- Part of: 5th Brigade, 2nd Division
- Garrison/HQ: HQ at Orange
- Motto(s): "Primus Agat Primas" (Let the First Be Foremost)

Insignia
- Unit colour patch

The 1st/19th Battalion, The Royal New South Wales Regiment (1/19 RNSWR) is an infantry battalion of the Australian Army. It is one of four battalions of the Royal New South Wales Regiment and is currently a Reserve unit attached to the 5th Brigade, 2nd Division. In its present form 1/19 RNSWR was initially raised in 1967 as 19th Battalion The Royal New South Regiment under the Command of LTCOL Thomas Joseph Crawford MBE ED. In 1971 following the reduction of 1st Battalion, Royal New South Wales Regiment (Commando) from Battalion strength to Company strength 19th Battalion was amalgamated with 1st Battalion and designated as 1st/19th Battalion RNSWR.These two units were previously linked between 1930 and 1939, although they can trace their lineage back to 1854 with the formation of a number of Volunteer Rifles units as part of the New South Wales colonial defence force. The battalion's headquarters is located in Romani Barracks, Orange, with four rifle companies spread across Wagga Wagga, Bathurst, Dubbo, and Canberra.

== History ==
The 1st/19th Battalion, Royal New South Wales Regiment was formed in 1971 as part of the Citizens Military Force (later known as the Australian Army Reserve) with the amalgamation of the 1st and 19th Battalions. The battalion had previously existed for a short time during the years between the First and Second World Wars, having been linked on 1 July 1930 when the decision was made to amalgamate a number of infantry battalions due to manpower shortages and financial constraints that resulted from the suspension of the compulsory training scheme and the Great Depression. During this time, the battalion was known as the 1st/19th Battalion (City of Sydney's Own Regiment). In 1939, with the prospect of war looming, the Australian government decided to expand the size of the Army, and as a consequence the 1st/19th was split once more and re-raised in their own right.

These two units had previously existed as separate entities with their own lineages that can be traced back to the earliest infantry units raised in New South Wales prior to Federation, which participated in a number of conflicts including the Mahdist War, the Boer War, and the First World War. By virtue of these predecessor units, the 1st/19th Battalion is the custodian of a number of battle honours from these conflicts. The battalion also maintains the battle honours of a number of units from the Second World War. Even though during the conflict the 1st Battalion was not deployed overseas on active service, the 19th Battalion was, being sent to New Guinea in 1944 and then later taking part in the New Britain campaign. The 1st/19th Battalion also maintains the battle honours of two Second Australian Imperial Force units, the 2/1st and 2/19th Battalions, which served in North Africa, Greece, New Guinea, Malaya and Borneo.

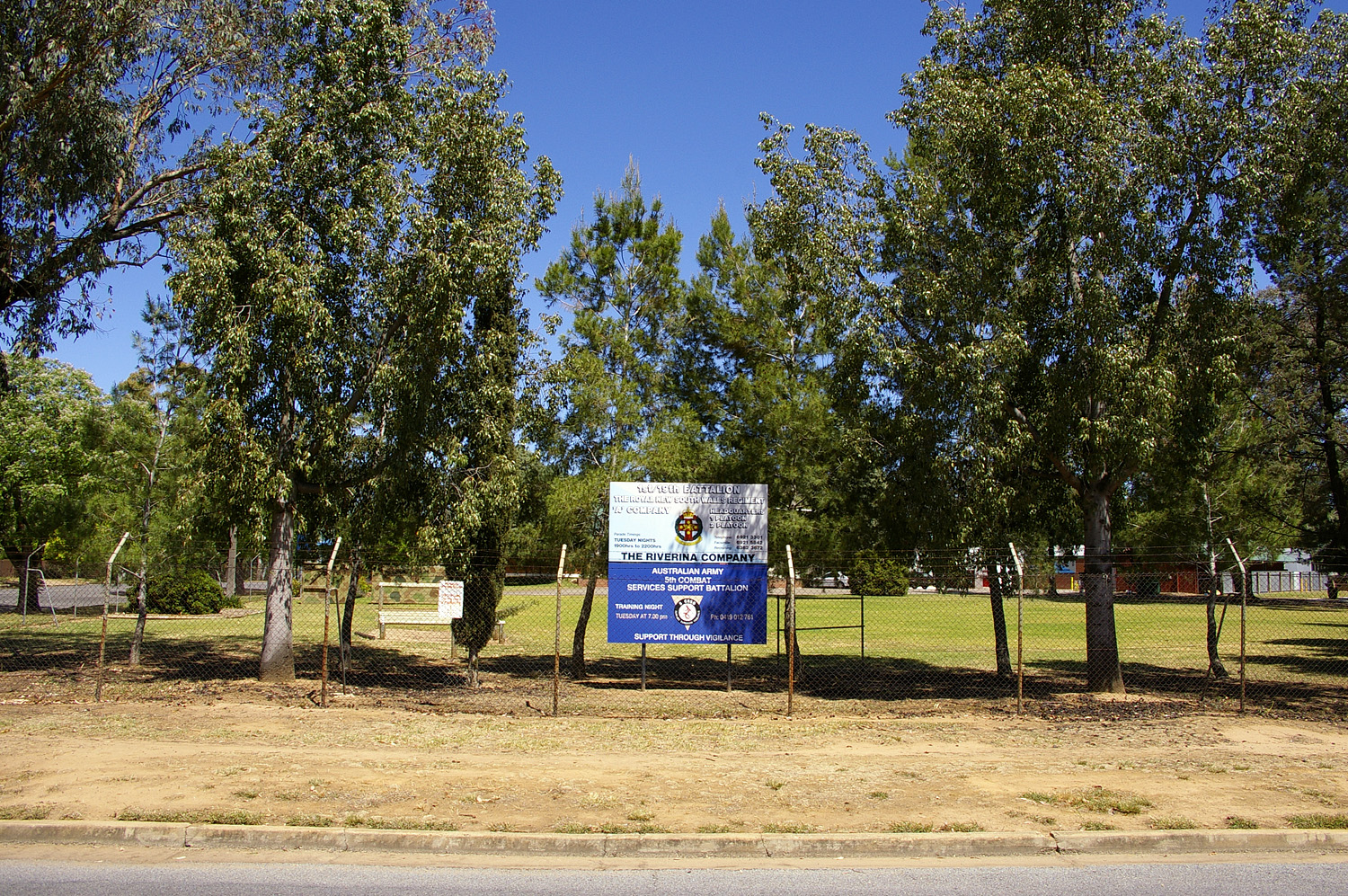
1st/19th RNSWR A Company "The Riverina Company" in Wagga Wagga

Following the end of the Second World War, these battalions were disbanded, and although the part-time military force, known as the Citizens Military Force, was re-raised in 1948, initially neither the 1st or the 19th Battalions were reformed at this time. In 1957, the 1st Battalion returned to the order of battle, when it was re-raised as the 1st Infantry Battalion (Commando), City of Sydney's Own Regiment. In 1960, following the introduction of the Pentropic divisional establishment into the Australian Army, this battalion was reduced to a company-sized unit in the newly raised 1st Battalion, Royal New South Wales Regiment. The Pentropic establishment did not last long and in 1965, when the Army returned to the previous Tropical establishment, the City of Sydney's Company was re-raised as a battalion in its own right. In 1966, the 19th Battalion was also re-raised as a battalion of the Royal New South Wales Regiment, attached at divisional-level to the Headquarters 2nd Division and taking on the role of a special conditions, or "Bushman's Rifles", battalion of the Citizens Military Force, offering National Servicemen from remote areas flexible training options in order to allow them to complete their service obligations.

In 1971, the decision was made to amalgamate the two battalions once more, and as a consequence the 1st/19th Battalion, Royal New South Wales Regiment was formed, being officially established on 1 May 1971. In August 1971, the battalion was entrusted with the 1st Battalion's Colours and the following year, on 13 August 1972, 1/19 RNSWR received the Colours of the 19th Battalion, in a ceremony at Holsworthy Barracks, presided over by the Governor of New South Wales, Sir Roden Cutler.

Since formation, 1/19 RNSWR, as part of the 5th Brigade, has continued to cater for the training needs of Reservists in regional areas, although after 1995 the unit no longer officially functioned as a "special conditions" battalion as all Reserve units were required to offer their soldiers flexible conditions after that date. In 1996 the battalion was decentralised and moved from Ingleburn, to four regional depots at Orange, Wagga Wagga, Bathurst and Dubbo. During the 2000 Summer Olympics, 1/19 RNSWR provided personnel to undertake search tasks as part of the Australian Army's security operations. In 2006, as part of Operation Acolyte, the battalion performed a similar role in support of the 2006 Commonwealth Games in Melbourne. Other recent activities undertaken by the battalion include a company-sized deployment to New Zealand to take part in exercises with other regional Reserve forces, various ceremonial duties and a continued commitment to contributing to Rifle Company Butterworth in Malaysia.

In May 2010, the battalion provided a platoon-sized element to Operation Anode Rotation 21 for service in the Solomon Islands as part of the Regional Assistance Mission to the Solomon Islands. This force returned to Australia in August 2010.

== Battle honours ==
1/19 RNSWR carries the following battle honours, which it inherited from its ancestral units:

- Suakin 1885.
- Boer War: South Africa 1899–1902.
- First World War: Hazebrouck, Amiens, Albert 1918 (Chuignes), Hindenburg Line, Hindenburg Line, Epehy, France and Flanders 1916–1918, ANZAC, Landing at ANZAC, Suvla, Sari Bair–Lone Pine, Somme 1916, Somme 1918, Pozieres, Bullecourt, Ypres 1917, Menin Road, Polygon Wood, Broodseinde, Poelcappelle, Passchendaele, Lys, Bapaume 1917, Hamel, Albert 1918, Mont St Quentin, Beaurevoir, Suvla, Gallipoli 1915–1916, Egypt 1915–1917, Palestine 1917–1918, Rumani.
- Second World War: North Africa, Bardia 1941, Capture of Tobruk, Greece 1941, Mount Olympus, Brallos Pass, Middle East 1941–1944, Crete, Retimo, South-West Pacific 1942–1945, Kokoda Trail, Eora Creek–Templeton's Crossing II, Oivi–Gorari, Buna–Gona, Sanananda Road, South-West Pacific 1945, Waitavolo, Liberation of Australian New Guinea, Malaya 1941–1942, Johore, The Muar, Singapore Island.

== Commanding officers ==
The following officers have commanded the battalion:

- Lieutenant Colonel T.C. Irwin, MBE ED (1 May 71 – 30 Apr 73)
- Lieutenant Colonel B.J. Falvey (1 May 73 – 21 Aug 75)
- Lieutenant Colonel K.J. Kirkby, ED (22 Aug 75 – 21 Sep 75)
- Lieutenant Colonel T.J. Jackson, ED (22 Sep 75 – 31 Mar 78)
- Lieutenant Colonel R.J. Arthur, ED (1 Apr 78 – 30 Sep 80)
- Lieutenant Colonel P.E.M. McGuinness, MBE OAM RFD ED (1 Oct 80 – 23 Sep 83)
- Lieutenant Colonel G.J. Beltrame, RFD (24 Sep 83 – 26 Sep 86)
- Lieutenant Colonel R.G. Martin, RFD (27 Sep 86 – 21 Sep 89)
- Lieutenant Colonel G.W.G. Steventon, MBE RFD (22 Sep 89 – 20 Sep 91)
- Lieutenant Colonel K.B. Templeton, AM RFD (21 Sep 91 – 31 Dec 93)
- Lieutenant Colonel G.F. Cook, RFD (1 Jan 94 – 31 Dec 96)
- Lieutenant Colonel B.E. Martyn, RFD (1 Jan 97 – 30 Jun 99)
- Lieutenant Colonel P.A. Wightman, RFD (1 Jul 99 – Dec 01)
- Lieutenant Colonel T.R. Thompson, RFD (Jan 02 – Dec 03)
- Lieutenant Colonel D.D. Littame (Jan 04 – Dec 05)
- Lieutenant Colonel A.J. Brennan (Jan 06 – Dec 07)
- Lieutenant Colonel P.J. Morrissey (Jan 08 – Dec 10)
- Lieutenant Colonel T.J. Betts (Jan 11 – Dec 13)
- Lieutenant Colonel A.W. Ang (Jan 14 – Dec 15)
