= 13th Battalion (Australia) =

Australian Army infantry battalion

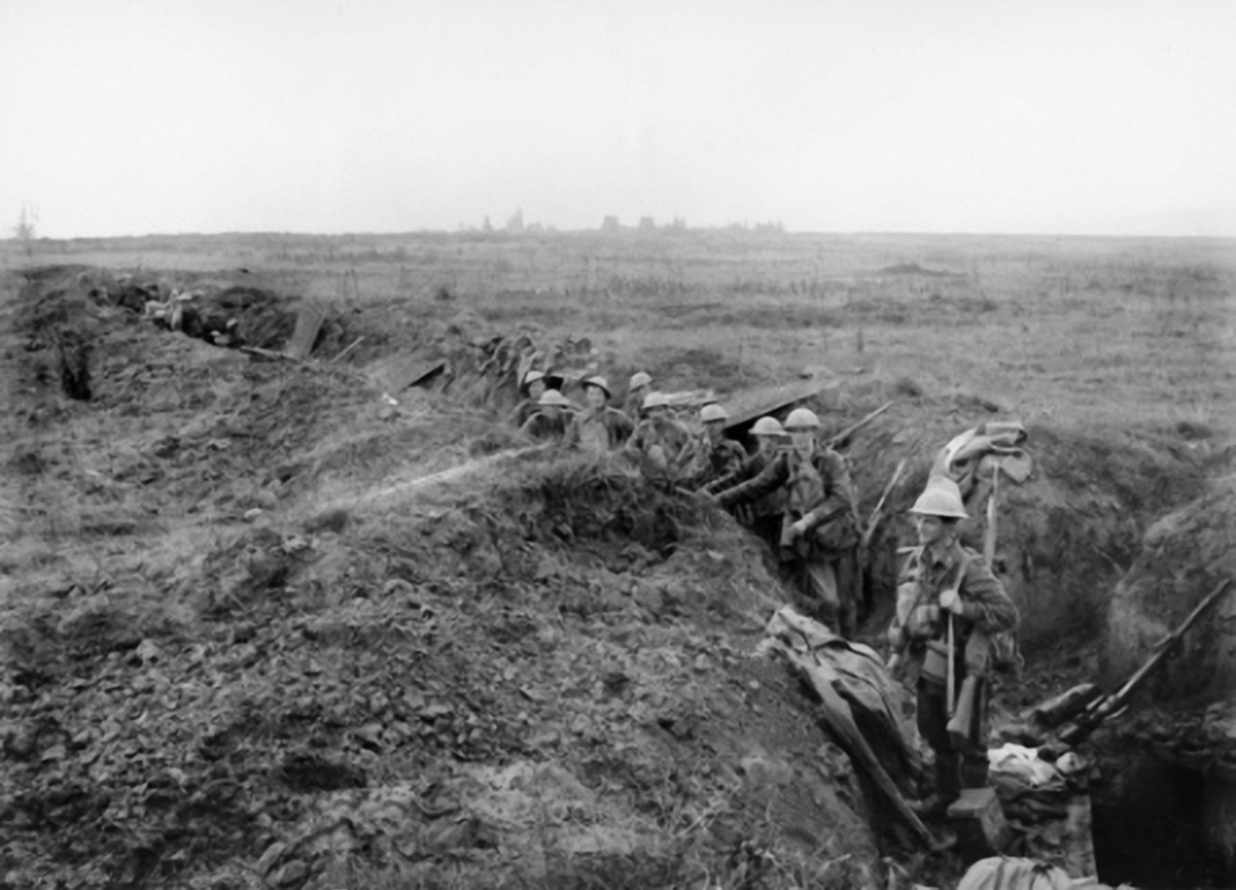
- Men of the 13th Battalion at Le Verguier, France, where Sergeant Buckley earned the Victoria Cross in 1918
- Active: 1914–1919; 1921–1942; 1948–1960
- Country: Australia
- Branch: Australian Army
- Type: Infantry
- Size: ~1,000 officers and men (Note: During the First World War the authorised strength of Australian infantry battalions was 1,023 men all ranks.)
- Part of: 4th Brigade, New Zealand and Australian Division (later 4th Australian Division)
- Motto: Vigor in Arduis (Energy amid hardship)
- Colours: Light blue over dark blue
- Engagements: First World War: Gallipoli campaign; Western Front

Commanders
- Notable commanders: James Murdoch Archer Durrant

Insignia
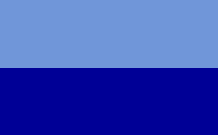
- Unit colour patch

The 13th Battalion was an infantry battalion of the Australian Army. Originally raised for the 1st Australian Imperial Force during the First World War, it was formed just six weeks after the start of the war. Along with the 14th, 15th and 16th Battalions which were recruited from New South Wales, it formed the 4th Brigade. The battalion saw service initially at Gallipoli before being transferred to France in 1916. For the next two years it fought in the trenches of the Western Front, earning numerous battle honours in the process.

Following the end of the war, the 13th Battalion was demobilised in early 1919. It was re-raised in 1921 as a unit of the part-time Citizens Force, based around Maitland, New South Wales. During the Second World War the battalion undertook garrison duties before being amalgamated with the 33rd Battalion in October 1942. It was re-raised for a third and final time sometime after 1948 and remained on the order of battle until 1960 when it was subsumed into the Royal New South Wales Regiment.

== History ==
=== First World War ===
Following the outbreak of war, the Australian government announced the decision to raise an all volunteer force for overseas service known as the Australian Imperial Force (AIF). Recruitment for this force began quickly and the 13th Battalion was among some of the first battalions to be raised, doing so in late September 1914, only six weeks after the declaration of war. Drawing its manpower from the state of New South Wales, it undertook training at the ANZAC Rifle Range in Long Bay, Sydney and Broadmeadows and Williamstown in Melbourne. It left Australia from Albany in late December and arrived in Egypt in February 1915.

Along with the rest of the 4th Brigade, under the command of then Colonel John Monash, the 13th Battalion took part in the Landing at Anzac Cove, arriving late on 25 April 1915. For the first four months, between May and August, they undertook defensive operations as the Anzacs attempted to establish themselves on the narrow beachhead that had been captured on the peninsula. On 8 August 1915 an attempt was made to break out from this position and the battalion took part in a costly, and only partially successful, attack on Hill 971. Later in the month, on 27 August, they were involved in another attack, this time on Hill 60, during which they suffered further casualties. After this the 13th Battalion was mainly used in a defensive role until the final evacuation in December 1915.

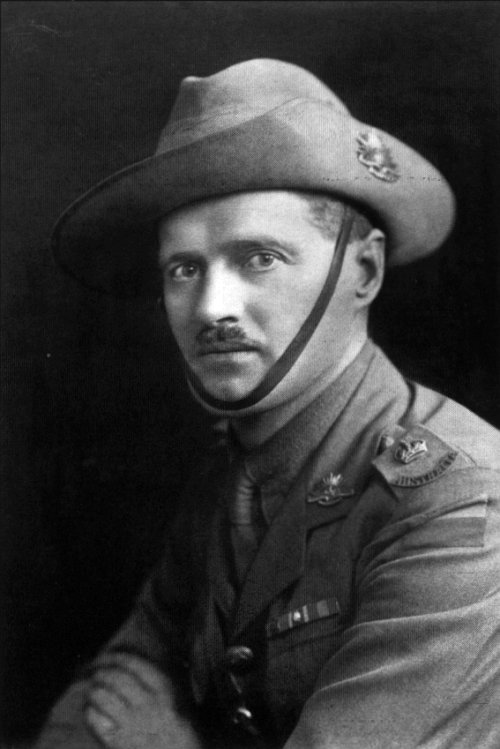
Portrait of Australian World War I Victoria Cross recipient, Major Harry Murray. In February 1917, then-Captain Murray led 'A' company of the 13th Battalion in an attack on "Stormy Trench", capturing the position and defending it against three German counter-attacks.

From there, the battalion returned to Egypt where the AIF underwent a period of training and reorganisation which saw the raising of two new divisions which effectively doubled its size. As a part of this expansion, the 13th Battalion was split and provided a cadre of soldiers who had served at Gallipoli to provide experienced men to the newly raised 45th Battalion. At the same time the reconstituted 4th Brigade was allocated to the Australian 4th Division along with the 12th and 13th Brigades. In June 1916, the battalion embarked for France to join other units of II Anzac Corps, and for the next two years it served in the trenches along the Western Front.

During this time, the 13th Battalion saw action in a number of major battles. The first such action that they were involved in came at Pozières in August 1916. Later, in February 1917, Captain Harry Murray, became the first member of the battalion to earn the Victoria Cross when he was involved in an attack near Gueudecourt. Later, at Bullecourt in April, the battalion, along with most of the 4th Brigade, suffered heavy losses when they ran up against a strongly defended German position without the tank support that they had been promised. After that, the 13th Battalion spent most of the remainder of 1917 in Belgium, as the Allied armies slowly advanced towards the heavily defended Hindenburg Line.

In March 1918, the Germans launched the Spring Offensive, which saw them gain considerable ground before being halted. During this time, the 13th Battalion undertook defensive operations in an effort to stem the tide. Later, a brief lull in the fighting occurred before the Allies launched their own offensive, known as the Hundred Days Offensive, which ultimately brought about an end to the war. The 13th Battalion was involved at the outset, taking part in the fighting around Amiens on 8 August 1918, which produced considerable gains for the Allies and was subsequently described as one of the greatest successes in a single day on the Western Front. On 18 September, the battalion took part in its last offensive action, this time around Le Verguier, and it was here that Sergeant Maurice Buckley, serving under the assumed name of Gerald Sexton, performed the deeds that led to him being awarded the Victoria Cross.

On 11 November 1918, an armistice came into effect and the fighting ended. Over the course of the next five months the battalion's personnel were slowly returned to Australia for demobilisation and discharge. On 18 March 1919, the battalion was finally disbanded, when its remaining personnel were formed into the 13th Composite Battalion along with drafts from the 14th, 15th and 16th Battalions. During the course of the war, the battalion lost 1,090 men killed and 2,128 wounded.

=== Interwar years, the Second World War and beyond ===
In 1921, the decision was made to perpetuate the numerical designations and battle honours of the AIF by re-raising those units as part of the Citizens Force. This was done by reorganising the existing Citizens Forces units so that they would adopt the identity of the AIF units that had been recruited within their regions and in which many of the pre-war citizen soldiers had served. As a result, by 1924, the 13th Battalion had been re-raised in the Maitland, New South Wales region. Upon formation, the newly raised battalion had drawn personnel from parts of the 13th and 22nd Infantry Regiments, and through its link with these units inherited the battle honour "South Africa 1900–1902". In 1927, territorial titles were introduced and the battalion adopted the title of the "Maitland Regiment", and the unit received its battle honours for the First World War. By 1928 it had been assigned to the 1st Brigade, attached to the 1st Division.

Following the election of the Scullin Labor government in 1929, the compulsory training scheme was suspended and the Citizens Forces became an all volunteer force. In order to reflect its voluntary basis, it was subsequently renamed the "Militia" at this time. The decision to suspend compulsory training, as well as the hardships associated with the Great Depression meant that many Militia units were afflicted by low manning levels. As a consequence of this, it was decided to amalgamate a number of units. The 13th Battalion was not one of the units affected by this decision, and it remained under the command of the 1st Brigade, which was headquartered in Newcastle, New South Wales as a subordinate unit of the 2nd Military District, until the start of the Second World War in September 1939.

During the war, because of the provisions of the Defence Act (1903), which prohibited sending the Militia to fight outside of Australian territory, the decision was made to raise an all volunteer force to serve overseas – the Second Australian Imperial Force (2nd AIF) – while the Militia would be used to undertake garrison duties in Australia. The compulsory training scheme was also re-instituted at this time and the Militia were called up for periods of continuous training that varied between 30 and 90 days. In October 1942, however, the battalion was amalgamated with the 33rd Battalion to form the 13th/33rd Battalion. Around this time, the battalion's machine gun company was detached and in conjunction with several other Militia machine gun companies, it was used to form the 6th Machine Gun Battalion. The 13th/33rd Battalion was itself later disbanded on 25 November 1943 when it became surplus to Army requirements.

In 1948, with the completion of the demobilisation process, the Citizens Force was re-raised as the Citizens Military Force (CMF), which was established on a restricted establishment of two divisions. The 13th Battalion (Maitland Regiment) was re-established sometime after this date. In 1952, it was re-designated as the "Macquarie Regiment". In 1960, the Australian Army adopted the Pentropic divisional establishment, the result of which was the reduction of a number of CMF units which were amalgamated to form larger Pentropic battalions as part of six new State-based regiments. At this time, the 13th Battalion was reduced to a company-level formation in the 2nd Battalion, Royal New South Wales Regiment, being designated 'D' (Macquarie) Company. In 1961, the 13th Battalion was entrusted with the battle honours of the 2nd AIF's 2/13th Battalion. When the Pentropic establishment was abandoned in 1965 the CMF was re-organised once more and most of the previously existing regional battalions were re-raised, but the 13th Battalion was not one of those units and it remained off the Army's order of battle.

== Battle honours ==
For their service, the 13th Battalion received the following battle honours:

- "South Africa 1900–1902" (inherited);
- First World War: Somme 1916, Somme 1918, Pozières, Bullecourt, Messines 1917, Ypres 1917, Menin Road, Polygon Wood, Passchendaele, Arras 1918, Ancre 1918, Hamel, Amiens, Albert 1918, Hindenburg Line, Epehy, France and Flanders 1916–1918, ANZAC, Landing at ANZAC, Defence at ANZAC, Suvla, Sari Bair.

== See also ==
- List of Australian Victoria Cross recipients

== Notes ==
Footnotes

Citations
