= 17th Battalion (Australia) =

Australian Army infantry battalion

17th Battalion later 17th Battalion, Royal New South Wales Regiment
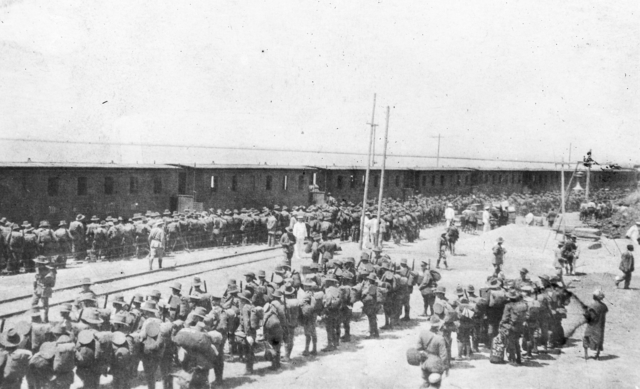
- The 17th Battalion entraining at Maritina Italiana in 1915
- Active: 1860–1878; 1888–1893; 1895–1944; 1965–1987
- Country: Australia
- Branch: Australian Army
- Type: Infantry
- Role: Line infantry
- Part of: 5th Brigade, 2nd Division
- Colours: Black over green
- Engagements: World War I World War II

Commanders
- Notable commanders: Henry Arthur Goddard; Edward Fowell Martin

Insignia
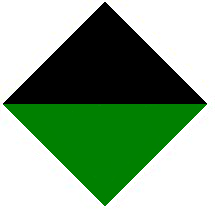
- Unit colour patch

The 17th Battalion was an infantry battalion of the Australian Army. Although its numerical designation was bestowed upon it during World War I, the 17th Battalion can trace its lineage back to 1860, when a unit of the New South Wales Volunteer Rifles was raised in St Leonards, New South Wales. This unit has since been disbanded and reformed a number times. Through its links with the units of the colonial New South Wales defence force, the battalion's history includes service in the Sudan and South Africa. During World War I, the 17th Battalion was raised for overseas service as part of the Australian Imperial Force. Attached to the 5th Brigade, 2nd Division, the battalion was raised in 1915 and sent to Egypt initially, before taking part in the fighting at Gallipoli against the Turks. Later the battalion was sent to the Western Front in France and Belgium, where it served in the trenches as part of the Australian Corps. Throughout the course of the war, the battalion won numerous battle honours and its members received many individual awards, however, at the end of the war the battalion was disbanded in April 1919.

In 1921 the battalion was reformed as a militia unit known as the 17th Battalion (North Sydney Regiment), before being disbanded in 1944. The battalion was reformed in 1948 as an amalgamated unit known as the 17th/18th Battalion (The North Shore Regiment), before being reduced to a company-sized element in the 2nd Battalion, Royal New South Wales Regiment in 1960. In 1965, the battalion was reformed again as the 17th Battalion, Royal New South Wales Regiment, before being amalgamated to form the 2nd/17th Battalion, Royal New South Wales Regiment in 1987.

== History ==
=== Formation ===
The battalion's origins began when the St Leonards Volunteer Rifles was raised in 1860 in the northern suburbs of Sydney as part of the military forces of the New South Wales colonial defence force. Members of this unit served overseas in 1885 in Sudan, and then again in South Africa during the Second Boer War. In 1903, following the Federation of Australia this unit became part of the Commonwealth Military Forces and was renamed the 1st Australian Infantry Regiment. In 1912, a system of compulsory military service was introduced and the unit was renamed the 18th Infantry, and then later, in 1914, the 17th Infantry.

=== World War I ===
When World War I began, due to the provisions of the Defence Act 1903 which precluded sending conscripts overseas to fight, it became necessary to raise an all volunteer force, separate to the militia, for service in the Middle East and Europe. This force was known as the Australian Imperial Force (AIF). As a part of this, the 17th Battalion was raised in March 1915 in Liverpool, New South Wales, forming part of the 5th Brigade, which was assigned to the 2nd Division. In May 1915, the battalion left Australia and after spending some time in Egypt training, they landed at Anzac Cove on 20 August 1915. They took part in the August Offensive, during which time they were engaged in the attack on Hill 60. Following this they were mainly used in a defensive role, defending Quinn's Post, which was one of the most fought over positions at Gallipoli.

The battalion was withdrawn from the peninsula in December 1915 along with the rest of the Allied forces after the decision was made to abandon the campaign. After this, a further period of training in Egypt was undertaken as the AIF was reorganised and expanded from two infantry divisions to five. In March 1916, the 17th Battalion was sent to France as the AIF's infantry divisions were transferred to the Western Front. The battalion moved up to the front line in April and took over the forward position in the eastern Armentières section. It was in June, during the prelude to the Battle of the Somme, when the battalion was positioned in the line around Armentières, that Private William Jackson earned the battalion's only Victoria Cross of the war. Later, the 17th Battalion took part in the first major battle at Pozières, serving in the line twice at this time between July and August. A period of respite followed after this, as the 17th was moved north to Belgium along with the rest of the 2nd Division, remaining there until October when they were transferred back to the Somme. For the remainder of the year they undertook defensive duties along the front, although they were not involved in any major attacks.

Victoria Cross recipient, William Jackson

In 1917, after enduring a harsh winter, the 17th Battalion was involved in most of the major battles as the German Army shortened their lines and withdrew back towards the Hindenburg Line, seeing action at Bullecourt in May, Menin Road in September and Poelcappelle in October. At Lagnicourt, on 15 April, the 17th took part in a defensive action along with four other battalions from the 5th Brigade, defeating a counter-attack by a numerically superior German force, and recapturing the village that had been lost along with a number of guns that the German force had taken off the Australians earlier. In early 1918, the battalion was involved in repelling the German spring offensive, undertaking defensive actions in the Somme Valley, before taking part in the final Allied offensive that eventually brought about an end to the war. During this time they were involved in the battles at Amiens and Mont St Quentin in August, before participating in the attack on the "Beaurevoir Line" at Montbrehain in October. This would be the battalion's last contribution to the war, as it was out of the line reorganising when the Armistice was declared in November 1918. It was disbanded in April 1919, while at Montigny-le-Tilluel, Belgium, when most of its personnel were transferred to the 20th Battalion.

During World War I the battalion suffered 3,280 casualties, of which 845 were killed. Members from the battalion also received the following decorations: one Victoria Cross, one Companion of the Order of St Michael and St George, seven Distinguished Service Orders, 19 Distinguished Conduct Medals, 33 Military Crosses, 138 Military Medals, 10 Meritorious Service Medals and 41 Mentions in Despatches.

=== Interwar years, World War II and post war ===
The demobilisation of the AIF was completed in early 1921 and in April that year it was officially disbanded. The Australian government then decided to reorganise the units of the Citizen Forces (later known as the "Militia") to perpetuate the divisional structure, numerical designations and battle honours of the AIF. As a result of this, the 17th Infantry, a militia unit that could trace its lineage back to 1860, was reformed as the 17th Battalion (The North Sydney Regiment), drawing personnel from the 17th Infantry Regiment. Through this link, the 17th Battalion inherited two theatre honours, "Suakin 1885" and "South Africa 1899–1902". During the inter-war years, the battalion was assigned to the 8th Brigade, which was headquartered in North Sydney and formed part of the 2nd Military District.

During World War II the battalion undertook garrison duties in Australia, as part of the 9th Brigade, based in New South Wales. Around November 1942, the battalion's machine gun company was detached and in conjunction with several other Militia machine gun companies, it was used to form the 6th Machine Gun Battalion. Although there were reductions among the home forces as the war progressed, the 17th Battalion remained on the Australian order of battle until 6 April 1944 when it was disbanded, having not seen active service during World War II, as the Australian Army sought to reallocate manpower back to industry or to other units that were engaged in combat operations in the Pacific.

In 1948 the battalion was re-raised as part of the Citizens Military Force, and was amalgamated with the 18th Battalion to form the 17th/18th Battalion (The North Shore Regiment). Upon reforming, the battalion was entrusted with the World War II battle honours of the 2/17th Battalion, in which many members of North Sydney Regiment had enlisted. The Australian Army was reorganised along Pentropic lines in 1960, and the battalion became 'B' Company, 2nd Battalion, Royal New South Wales Regiment (2 RNSWR). The battalion also formed the nucleus of 2 RNSWR's support company and regimental band. When the Pentropic divisional structure was abandoned in 1965, the battalion was reformed in its own right as the 17th Battalion, Royal New South Wales Regiment. This lasted until 1987 when another reorganisation of the Australian Army Reserve led to the unit's amalgamation to form the 2nd/17th Battalion, Royal New South Wales Regiment.

== Battle honours ==
The 17th Battalion received the following battle and theatre honours:

- Suakin 1885.
- Boer War: South Africa 1899–1902.
- World War I: Suvla, Gallipoli 1915–16, Egypt 1915–16, Somme 1916–18, Pozières, Bapaume 1917, Bullecourt, Ypres 1917, Menin Road, Polygon Wood, Broodseinde, Poelcappelle, Passchendaele, Hamel, Amiens, Albert 1918, Mont St Quentin, Hindenburg Line, Beaurevoir, France and Flanders 1916–18.
- World War II: North Africa 1941–42, Defence of Tobruk, El Adem Road, El Alamein, South-West Pacific 1943–45, Lae–Nadzab, Finschhafen, Scarlet Beach, Defence of Scarlet Beach, Jivenaneng–Kumawa, Liberation of Australian New Guinea, Sio, Borneo, Brunei, Alam el Halfa.

== Lineage ==
The 17th Battalion's lineage is as follows:
1860–1868 – 1st Regiment New South Wales Rifle Volunteers (St Leonards Volunteer Rifles)
1868–1876 – The Suburban Battalion, New South Wales Volunteer Rifles
1876–1878 – 2nd Regiment Volunteer Rifles
1888–1893 – St Leonards Reserve Rifle Company
1895–1901 – North Sydney Company, 1st Regiment New South Wales Volunteer Infantry
1901–1903 – 1st Infantry Regiment
1903–1908 – 1st Australian Infantry Regiment
1908–1912 – 1st Battalion, 1st Australian Infantry Regiment
1912–1913 – 18th Infantry Regiment
1913–1914 – 18th (North Sydney) Infantry
1914–1918 – 17th Infantry
1918–1921 – 5th Battalion, 17th Infantry Regiment
1921–1927 – 17th Battalion
1927–1944 – 17th Battalion (The North Sydney Regiment)
1948–1960 – 17th/18th Battalion (The North Shore Regiment)
1960–1965 – 'B' Coy, 2nd Battalion, Royal New South Wales Regiment
1965–1987 – 17th Battalion, Royal New South Wales Regiment.

== See also ==
- List of Australian Victoria Cross recipients
