= 5th Brigade (Australia) =

Australian Army reserve combined arms brigade

- Active: 1912–1919; 1921–1944; 1948–1960; 1965–present
- Country: Australia
- Branch: Army
- Type: Reserve
- Size: 100 (active); 2,000 (reserve); 40 (civilian)
- Part of: 2nd Division
- Engagements: First World War: Gallipoli; Western Front

Insignia
- Unit colour patch

5th Brigade is a brigade of the Australian Army. Originally raised as a militia formation in 1912, the 5th Brigade was re-raised for overseas service in 1915 as part of the Australian Imperial Force during the First World War. The brigade then served during the Gallipoli Campaign and on the Western Front. During the inter-war years, it was re-raised as a part-time formation as part of Citizens Military Force. It undertook garrison duties in Australia during the Second World War, but was not deployed overseas before being disbanded in 1944. Following the war, the brigade was re-raised in 1948 once again and it is currently a Reserve combined arms formation based in New South Wales and forms part of the 2nd Division.

== History ==
The 5th Brigade traces its origins to 1912, when it was formed as a militia brigade as part of the introduction of the compulsory training scheme, assigned to the 2nd Military District. At this time, the brigade's constituent units had training depots located around New South Wales including Mosman, Neutral Bay, North Sydney, Chatswood, Hunter's Bay, Hornsby, Granville, and Parramatta.

Following the outbreak of the First World War, the 5th Brigade was re-raised in mid-1915 as part of the Australian Imperial Force (AIF) from volunteers for overseas service. Upon formation it consisted of four infantry battalions—the 17th, 18th, 19th and 20th Battalions. Assigned to the 2nd Division, the majority of its personnel were drawn from men that had previously served in New Guinea with the Australian Naval and Military Expeditionary Force. After formation, the brigade departed Australia, embarking for Egypt, in May 1915, and after a period of training, were dispatched to Gallipoli in August as reinforcements for the 1st Division, which had been there since April. The brigade subsequently took part in the August Offensive, as the Allies sought to break the deadlock that had descended on the peninsula. After the offensive failed, the 5th Brigade remained at Gallipoli, undertaking mainly defensive tasks until they were evacuated in December 1915 and withdrawn back to Egypt. In early 1916, the brigade was sent to France as part of the large-scale transfer of the AIF's infantry divisions to the European battlefield. For the next two-and-a-half years the 5th Brigade fought on the Western Front, taking part in numerous battles.

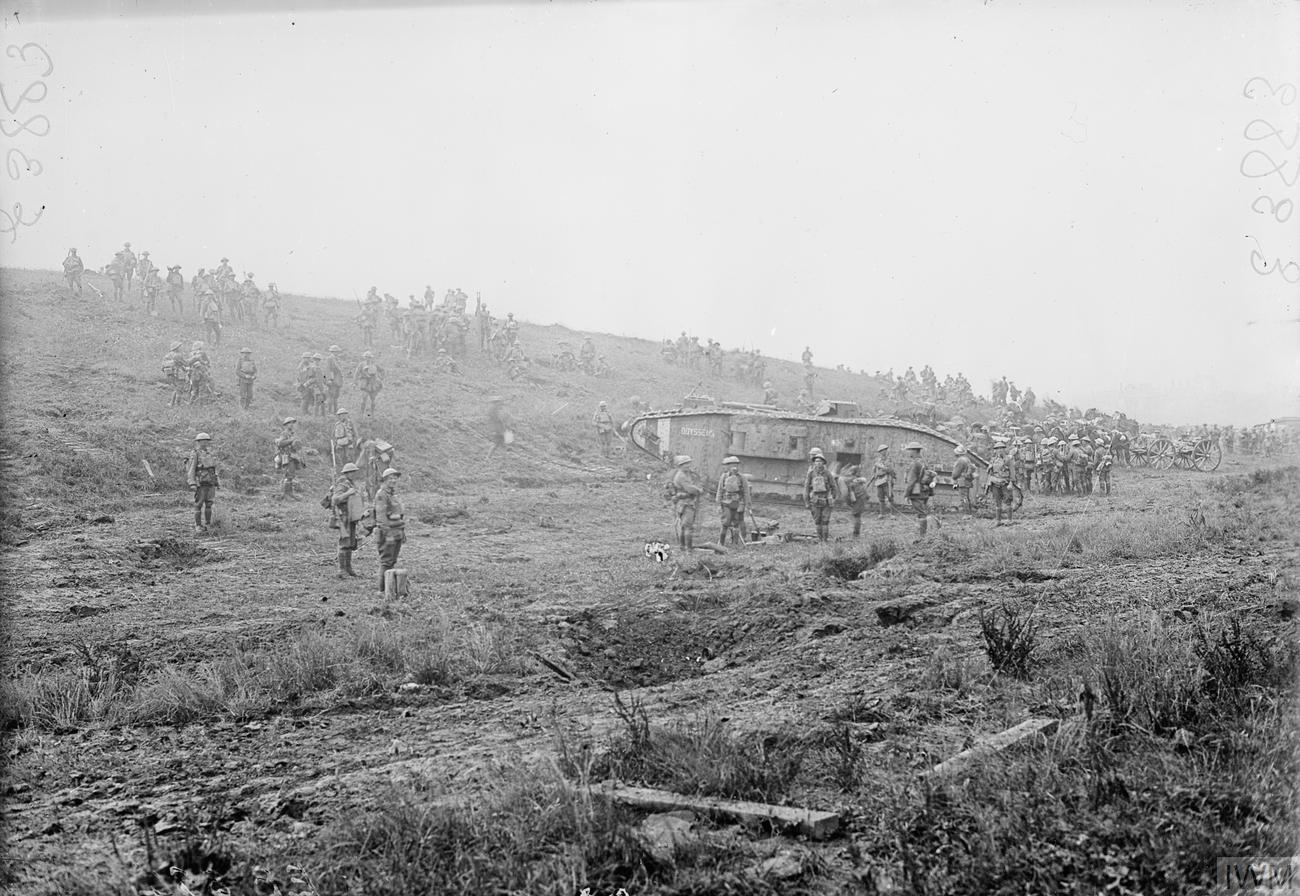
5th Brigade at Picardie, France, 8 August 1918

In July 1916, they were committed to the Battle of Pozières, after which the brigade was moved to Belgium before returning to the Somme. In May 1917, as the Germans withdrew to the Hindenburg Line, the brigade took part in the Battle of Lagnicourt in April 1917 and then the Second Battle of Bullecourt in May. Later in the year they were heavily committed, joining actions at Menin Road in September 1917 and Pelcappelle in October. In early 1918, the Germans launched the Spring Offensive, during which the 5th Brigade fought a series of defensive actions in the Somme Valley, before taking part in the final Allied offensive that eventually brought about an end to the war. During this time they were involved in the battles at Amiens in August, Mont St Quentin in September, and Montbrehain in October.

Following the end of the war, the 5th Brigade was disbanded, however, it was re-raised in 1921 as part of the Citizens Military Force when Australia's part-time military forces were reorganised to replicate the structure of the AIF. Based in New South Wales, and headquartered in Sydney, at this time it consisted of the 4th, 20th, 36th and 54th Battalions, and was once again force assigned to the 2nd Division. During the Second World War, the brigade was reduced to three infantry battalions after the Australian Army adopted the British brigade structure—initially the 20th, 54th and 56th Battalions—although its composition changed several times during the war, with various other units including the 44th Battalion joining the brigade. It was mobilised for full-time defensive service in December 1941 following Japan's entry into the war and concentrated at Bathurst. It undertook defensive duties in New South Wales and Western Australia throughout the war. In January 1944, the brigade moved to Queensland to begin preparing for operations in New Guinea. These plans were not enacted and the brigade was disbanded in June 1944 as part of the reallocation of manpower and resources undertaken by the Army at the time to reinforce operational units that were already deployed.

In 1948, the CMF was established once more, albeit on a limited scale and the 5th Brigade was re-raised as part of the 2nd Division. In 1960, with the introduction of the Pentropic divisional structure, the brigade ceased to exist as it was decided to move away from the traditional triangular formation. The Pentropic structure was abandoned in 1965, however, and the Army returned to the previous tropical establishment. The brigade was reformed at this time, albeit under the guise of the "5th Task Force", and consisted of three battalions—3 RNSWR, 4 RNSWR and 17 RNSWR. In 1982, it reverted to the designation of "5th Brigade" and in 1987 all Reserve formations were reduced to two infantry battalions.

Today, 5th Brigade is a combined arms formation of the Australian Army Reserve, based in New South Wales and it is one of six brigades of the 2nd Division.

== Organisation ==
As of 2026 the brigade consists of:

- Headquarters 5th Brigade (located at Holsworthy Barracks, Sydney)
- 1st/15th Royal New South Wales Lancers (located at Lancer Barracks, Parramatta)
- 1st/19th Battalion, Royal New South Wales Regiment (located at Orange)
- 2nd/17th Battalion, Royal New South Wales Regiment
- 4th/3rd Battalion, Royal New South Wales Regiment (located at Sutherland)
- 41st Battalion, Royal New South Wales Regiment
- 5th Engineer Regiment
- 5th Combat Service Support Battalion.
