= 4th/3rd Battalion, Royal New South Wales Regiment =

Australian Army Reserve unit

- Active: 26 September 1987 – present
- Country: Australia
- Branch: Army
- Type: Light infantry
- Size: One battalion
- Part of: 5th Brigade
- Garrison/HQ: Sutherland, New South Wales
- Mottos: For Home and Country
- Colours: White and green
- March: Quick, Slow
- Anniversaries: ANZAC Day

Insignia
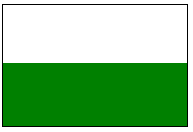
- Unit colour patch

4th/3rd Battalion, Royal New South Wales Regiment (4/3 RNSWR) is a Reserve light infantry battalion of the Australian Army. 4/3 RNSWR has been deployed on active service on many peacekeeping operations and exercises within Australia and around the world. The Battalion is currently based at Sutherland, New South Wales where it forms part of the 5th Brigade.

== History ==
=== Formation ===
The 1987 reorganisation of the Army Reserve, involving a reduction in the number of infantry battalions across Australia, brought about a linking of the 3rd and 4th Battalions, and a public ceremony on 26 September of that year marked the presence of the new 4/3 RNSWR.

The new battalion, now extending across south-eastern New South Wales, has continued its standard training programmes in pursuit of its operational readiness objectives.

Significant groups of unit members attended the Royal Regiment of Wales Tercentenary celebrations in Cardiff, in 1989, and the 75th Anniversary Commemoration at Gallipoli in 1990, and the unit has had ongoing involvement in Australian and overseas exercise training programmes.

=== Recent history ===
Operation Anode is the Australian Defence Force's role in supporting RAMSI (Regional Assistance Mission to the Solomon Islands). Soldiers from 4/3 RNSWR has supported RAMSI in multiple brigade led deployments as a peacekeeping force to assist local and international police force's in the re-stabilisation of the Solomon Islands in conjunction with the New Zealand, Papua New Guinea and Tongan defence forces.

Operation Astute was an Australian-led military deployment to East Timor to quell unrest and return stability in the 2006 East Timor crisis.

Operation Resolute is commanded by the joint civilian-military Border Protection Command and the ADF contributes Royal Australian Navy ships, Royal Australian Air Force aircraft and patrols from the Australian Army's Regional Force Surveillance Units as required. Soldiers from 4/3 RNSWR have been regularly deployed on OP Resolute.

== Battle honours ==
The 3rd Battalion received the following battle honours:

- "Suakin 1885" (inherited);
- "South Africa 1899–1902" (inherited);
- World War I: Somme 1916, Somme 1918, Pozieres, Bullecourt, Ypres 1917, Menin Road, Polygon Wood, Broodseinde, Poelcappelle, Passchendaele, Lys, Hazebrouck, Amiens, Albert 1918 (Chuignes), Hindenburg Line, Hindenburg Line, Epehy, France and Flanders 1916–1918, ANZAC, Landing at ANZAC, Defence at ANZAC, Suvla, Sari Bair–Lone Pine.
- World War II: Ioribaiwa, Kokoda Trail, Eora Creek–Templeton's Crossing II, Oivi–Gorari, Buna–Gona, Gona, Liberation of Australian New Guinea.

The 4th Battalion received the following battle honours:

- Second Boer War: South Africa 1900–02. (Note: The 4th Battalion inherited this battle honour from its predecessor units which contributed to the New South Wales Contingents that were sent to South Africa during the Second Boer War.)
- First World War: ANZAC, Landing at ANZAC, Defence at ANZAC, Suvla, Sari Bair–Lone Pine, Somme 1916, Somme 1918, Pozieres, Bullecourt, Ypres 1917, Menin Road, Polygon Wood, Broodseinde, Poelcappelle, Passchendaele, Lys, Hazebrouck, Amiens, Albert 1918 (Chuignes), Hindenburg Line, Hindenburg Line, Epehy, France and Flanders 1916–1918.
- Second World War: South-West Pacific 1944–45, Liberation of Australian New Guinea, North Africa, Bardia 1941, Capture of Tobruk, Greece 1941, Veve, Soter, Middle East 1941–1944, Crete, Heraklion, South-West Pacific 1942–1945, Liberation of Australian New Guinea, Wewak, Wirui Mission, Mount Shiburangu–Mount Tazaki. (Note: Battle honours for the Second World War include both the 4th Battalion and 2/4th Battalion, as the 4th Battalion inherited the 2/4th's battle honours upon being re-raised in 1957. The 4th Battalion earned two battle honours during the war, while the 2/4th earned 14, one of which the 4th also earned.)

== Commanding Officers ==
Dates	Name
26 Sep 87 – 31 Jan 89	LTCOL F.G. Harvison, RFD
1 Feb 89 – 24 Mar 91	LTCOL P.F. Murphy, RFD
25 Mar 91 – 31 Dec 93	LTCOL M.F. Peebles, RFD
1 Jan 94 – 31 Dec 96	LTCOL M. Vertzonis, RFD
1 Jan 97 – 31 Dec 99	LTCOL P. Brereton, RFD, SC
1 Jan 01 – 31 Dec 01	LTCOL T. Vail, RFD
01 Jan 02 – 31 Dec 03	LTCOL A.M. Bell, RFD
01 Jan 04 – 31 Dec 05	LTCOL L.G Lucas
1 Jan 06 – 31 Dec 07	LTCOL G.R Weir
1 Jan 08 – 31 Dec 09	LTCOL M.J Callan
1 Jan 10 – 31 Dec 12	LTCOL M.A. Sasse
1 Jan 13 – 31 Dec 14	LTCOL R.J. Miller
1 Jan 15 – 31 Dec 17	LTCOL A.P. Bailey
1 Jan 18 – 31 Dec 20	LTCOL D. Charlton
1 Jan 21 - present	LTCOL P. Hukins

== Current composition ==
4/3 RNSWR currently consists of:

- Battalion Headquarters
- 3 Rifle Companies – 'B', 'C' and 'D'
- Band
- Signals PL
- DFSW PL
- Motorised PL
