= John Lamrock =

Australian soldier and horse administrator

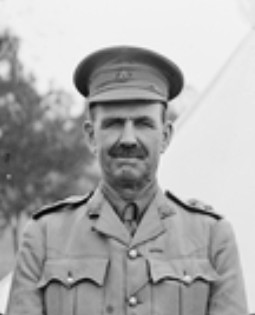
- Lamrock in 1915
- Born: 25 December 1859; Kurrajong, New South Wales
- Died: 19 July 1935 (aged 75); Stanmore, New South Wales
- Military career
- Allegiance: Australia
- Branch: Australian Army
- Rank: Brigadier General
- Commands: 2nd Division; 5th Infantry Brigade; 20th Infantry Battalion
- Conflicts: First World War; Gallipoli Campaign; Western Front
- Awards: Companion of the Order of the Bath; Colonial Auxiliary Forces Officers' Decoration; Mentioned in Despatches
- Other work: Secretary of the Moorefield Race Club

Brigadier General John Lamrock, CB, VD (25 December 1859 – 19 July 1935) was a senior Australian soldier who served during World War I, and a horse racing administrator.

== Early life ==
Lamrock was born at Kurrajong, New South Wales, on 25 December 1859, one of seven children of Elizabeth (née Skuthorpe) and William Lamrock. He was educated at Newington College at Newington House on the Parramatta River at Silverwater, New South Wales (1873–1874) and Sydney Grammar School (1875–1877). After finishing his schooling he lived for many years in the Hawkesbury district and for a time served as a councillor and President of the Colo Shire Council. In 1885, he married Mary Bowman Cameron of Richmond, New South Wales.

== Horse racing ==
In 1877, Lamrock became a member of the Hawkesbury Race Club and at the time of his death he was chairman. He was a race meeting judge on the former Clarendon course, and for the Newcastle Jockey Club and the former Menangle Club. Lamrock was appointed secretary of the Moorefield Race Club in 1912 and remained in that position until early in 1935. Moorefield Racecourse opened in 1888 and was in the area bounded by President Avenue, Marshall Street and the Princes Highway, Kogarah, New South Wales, and was subdivided in the 1950s. Before and after the war, Lamrock lived at Glenroy, Kensington Street, Kogarah.

== First World War ==
In April 1915, Lamrock was posted as a lieutenant colonel in command of the 20th Battalion, Australian Imperial Force, and remained in charge of that battalion until the completion of the Gallipoli Campaign. When he returned to Australia in 1916 he was appointed as the camp commandant at Liverpool, New South Wales. Having been Mentioned in Despatches, he was later promoted to the rank of brigadier general and appointed a Companion of the Order of the Bath. At war's end he returned to his role at Moorefield.

== Death ==
Lamrock was a resident of Gladstone Parade, Lindfield, New South Wales, when he died post-operatively at Braeside Private Hospital, Stanmore. He was survived by his wife, Mary, daughters, Gwen and Ethel, and son, Alan.
