= Walter Brown (soldier) =

Recipient of the Victoria Cross

Walter Ernest Brown VC DCM
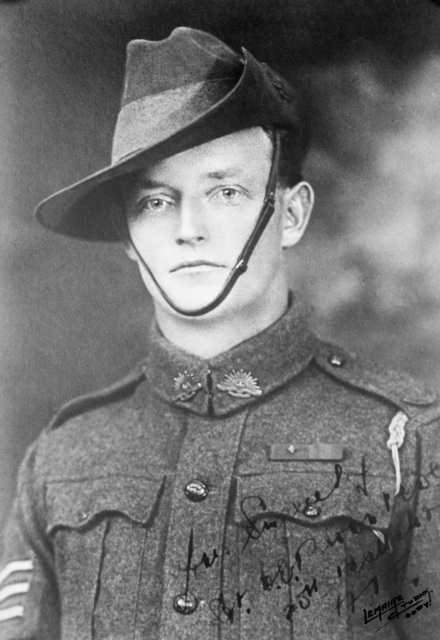
- Walter Ernest Brown
- Born: 3 July 1885; New Norfolk, Tasmania, Australia
- Died: 28 February 1942 (aged 56); Rengat, Dutch East Indies
- Military career
- Allegiance: Australia
- Branch: Australian Army
- Service years: 1915–20; 1940–42
- Rank: Sergeant (WW1); Gunner (WW2)
- Conflicts: First World War; Western Front; Battle of Passchendaele; German spring offensive; Second World War; Pacific War; Malayan campaign; Battle of Singapore (MIA)
- Awards: Victoria Cross; Distinguished Conduct Medal

Walter Ernest Brown, VC, DCM (3 July 1885 – 28 February 1942) was an Australian recipient of the Victoria Cross, the highest award for gallantry in the face of the enemy that can be awarded to members of the British and Commonwealth forces. He was born in Tasmania and worked as a grocer before enlisting in the Australian Army in 1915, following the outbreak of First World War. Initially he was sent to Egypt where he served in the Australian Service Corps before being transferred to the Western Front where he served in the infantry with the 20th Battalion. In July 1918, during the fighting at Villers-Bretonneux he single-handedly destroyed a German machine-gun post, taking a number of prisoners in the process. For this act he was awarded the Victoria Cross. He was also later awarded the Distinguished Conduct Medal for a previous act of bravery.

Following the war, Brown was repatriated to Australia and returned to civilian life. When the Second World War began, he lied about his age and previous experience in order to re-enlist in the Second Australian Imperial Force, this time serving in the Royal Australian Artillery. In 1942 Brown's unit, the 2/15th Field Regiment, participated in the Malayan campaign following the Japanese invasion of Malaya, and retreated to Singapore. The garrison at Singapore surrendered on 15 February 1942. Brown is believed to have been killed subsequently, with his date of death given as 28 February 1942, although his body has never been recovered.

== Early life ==
Walter Ernest Brown was born on 3 July 1885 in New Norfolk, Tasmania. His parents were Sidney Francis Brown—a miller—and Agnes Mary Brown (née Carney). After finishing his schooling, he worked as a grocer in Hobart until 1911, when he moved to Petersham, New South Wales, where he remained in the same line of work until the First World War broke out.

== First World War ==
Brown enlisted in the Australian Imperial Force in July 1915 and was initially assigned to the 1st Australian Light Horse Regiment, before being transferred to the Imperial Camel Corps in Egypt. After being transferred to France he was assigned to the 55th Battalion, Australian Infantry; 1st and 2nd Field Butcheries, Australian Service Corps; and then, finally, the 20th Battalion, 5th Brigade, 2nd Division.

He managed to secure his transfer to the infantry by claiming that he had lost his false teeth, which meant that he had to be removed from the theatre and returned to Egypt, where he was able to attach himself to the infantry reinforcements that were being concentrated there prior to being sent to France to join the 20th Battalion.

His transfer to the 20th Battalion took place in July 1917 and he joined them while they were stationed in the line around St Omer. During September and October 1917, Brown took part in the fighting around Passchendaele and it was for his actions during this time that he was later awarded the Distinguished Conduct Medal. On 19 October he was promoted to lance corporal. In November he was wounded, however, he returned to his unit shortly after and on 7 April 1918 he was promoted to the rank of corporal.

On 6 July 1918 at Villers-Bretonneux, France he performed the deed for which he was awarded the Victoria Cross: Brown had rushed a machine-gun post armed with a hand grenade, taking one officer and 11 men prisoner under heavy machine-gun fire. After this incident Brown remained at the front until the end of the war, and despite being wounded again in August he was promoted to sergeant on 13 September 1918.

Following the war he was repatriated to Australia in late 1919 before being discharged on medical grounds in February 1920.

=== Victoria Cross citation ===
The award of the Victoria Cross to Brown was published in a supplement to The London Gazette on 17 August 1918, reading:

War Office, 17th August, 1918.

His Majesty the KING has been graciously pleased to approve of the award of the Victoria Cross to the undermentioned Non-commissioned Officers and Man: —

No. 1689A Corporal Walter Ernest Brown, D.C.M., A.I.F.

For most conspicuous bravery and determination when with an advanced party from his battalion which was going into the line in relief.

The company to which he was attached carried out during the night a minor operation resulting in the capture of a small system of enemy trench. Early on the following morning an enemy strong post about seventy. yards distant caused the occupants of the newly captured trench great inconvenience by persistent sniping. Hearing that it had been decided to rush this post, Corporal Brown, on his own initiative, crept out along the shallow trench and made a dash towards the post. An enemy machine gun opened fire from another trench and forced him to take cover. Later he again dashed forward and reached his objective. With a Mills grenade in his hand he stood at the door of a dug-out and called on the occupants to surrender. One of the enemy rushed out, a scuffle ensued, and Corporal Brown knocked him down with his fist. Loud cries of "Kamerad" were then heard, and from the dug-out an officer and eleven, other ranks appeared. This party Corporal Brown brought back as prisoners to our line, the enemy meanwhile from other positions bringing heavy machine-gun fire to bear on the party.

== Inter war years ==
After being discharged from the AIF in early 1920, Brown went to live in Sydney. During this time he undertook a number of different lines of work, being employed as a brass-finisher up until 1930 when he moved to Leeton and taking up a position as a water-bailiff in the New South Wales Water Conservation and Irrigation Commission. He remained in this job until he rejoined the Army in 1940.

On 4 June 1932 Brown married Maude Dillon at Christ Church in Bexley. The couple had two children, a boy and a girl.

== Second World War ==
Following the outbreak of the Second World War, Brown enlisted as a gunner under his real name in the 2/15th Field Regiment, Royal Australian Artillery in June 1940. Hoping to avoid attention and wanting to secure a posting to the front lines, he declared that he had "no previous military experience" and also claimed he had been born in 1900 in order to meet the age requirements for front line service. Although his identity became public knowledge, the military authorities allowed him to continue serving. He was briefly promoted to lance-sergeant, but requested to revert to the rank of gunner. His unit was sent to Malaya in August 1941 where they were attached to the 27th Brigade, and then to Singapore in February 1942 when it was invaded.

On 15 February 1942, Brown's regiment moved up to the front line to make a final stand. Sources disagree as to what happened to Brown after this. When the order to surrender came, some witnesses alleged him to have calmly picked up some grenades and said: "No surrender for me", before walking towards the enemy lines, never to be seen again.

Author John Moremon, however, suggests, from records held at the Australian War Memorial, that Brown sought to escape and after gaining permission from his commanding officer, led a group of 2/15th men to Rengat, in Sumatra, in a rowing boat. From there it is believed that Brown and the others attempted to link up with other troops that were being evacuated via bus, but they became separated and although some managed to get away to Padang, Brown is believed to have been killed while waiting for transport.

Although his date of death is uncertain, it has been presumed that Brown was killed some time after he went missing, and the Commonwealth War Graves Commission officially records his date of death as 28 February 1942. As his body was never found, Brown has no known grave, although he is commemorated at the Singapore Memorial at Kranji War Cemetery in Singapore.

== Medals ==
His Victoria Cross is displayed at the Australian War Memorial in Canberra.

Ribbon	Description	Notes
Ribbon for the VC	Victoria Cross (VC)	gazetted 1918
Ribbon for the DCM	Distinguished Conduct Medal (DCM)	gazetted 1918
Ribbon for the 1914–15 Star	1914–15 Star	
Ribbon for the BWM	British War Medal	
Ribbon for the Victory Medal	Victory Medal	

Brown's service in World War II resulted in the posthumous award of five further service medals, these being the 1939–1945 Star, Pacific Star, Defence Medal (United Kingdom), War Medal 1939–1945, and Australia Service Medal 1939–1945.

== See also ==
- List of people who disappeared
