= 48th Battalion (Australia) =

Australian Army infantry battalion

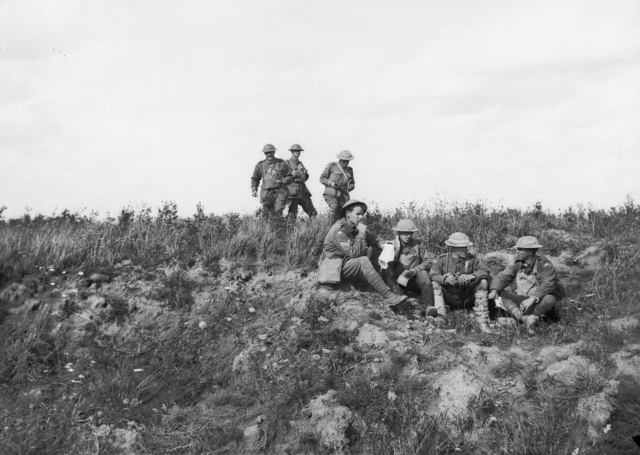
- Soldiers from the 48th Battalion before their final attack at Le Verguier, September 1918
- Active: 1916–1919; 1921–1930; 1930–1939 (43rd/48th Battalion); 1939–1942; 1942–1945 (10th/48th Battalion); 1952–1960 (43rd/48th Battalion)
- Country: Australia
- Branch: Australian Army
- Type: Infantry
- Size: ~800–1,000 officers and men
- Part of: 12th Brigade; 4th Division
- Nickname: "Joan of Arc Battalion"
- Engagements: World War I: Western Front; World War II

Insignia
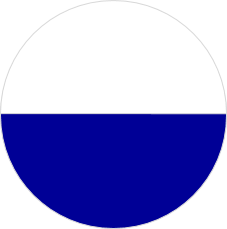
- Unit colour patch

The 48th Battalion was an infantry battalion of the Australian Army. It was originally raised in 1916 for service during World War I and took part in the fighting in the trenches of the Western Front in France and Belgium, before being disbanded in early 1919. After the war, the battalion was re-raised as a part-time unit based initially in Victoria and later in South Australia. In 1930 it was amalgamated with the 43rd Battalion and remained so until late 1939, subsequently being linked with the 10th Battalion in 1942. The battalion did not see combat during World War II, and after the war was re-raised as an amalgamated unit, again with the 43rd Battalion, in 1952. They remained linked until 1960 when the 43rd/48th Battalion was subsumed by the Royal South Australia Regiment.

== History ==
=== World War I ===
The 48th Battalion was raised in Egypt on 16 March 1916 as part of the reorganisation and expansion of the Australian Imperial Force (AIF) following the Gallipoli campaign. This was achieved by transferring cadres of experienced personnel predominately from the 1st Division to the newly formed battalions and combining them with recently recruited personnel who had been dispatched as reinforcements from Australia. The unit's first intake of personnel were drawn from men originating from South Australia and Western Australia, many of whom had already served with the 16th Battalion. Under the command of Lieutenant Colonel Raymond Leane, formerly of the 11th Battalion, the battalion became part of the 12th Brigade attached to the 4th Australian Division. Several of Leane's relatives, including his brother, Benjamin, who served as adjutant, and three of his nephews – Allan, Reuben, and Geoffrey – and a few others, also served in the 48th. As a result, the battalion was nicknamed the "Joan of Arc Battalion", in reference to a quip that the battalion was "made of (all) Leanes" – that is, a pun on Joan's own nickname, "The Maid of Orleans.

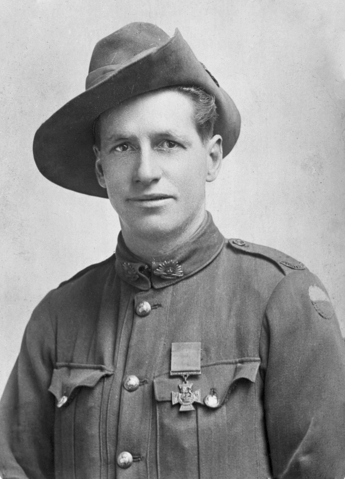
Private James Woods, who received the Victoria Cross for his actions in September 1918.

Throughout March and April 1916, the battalion undertook training in the desert before being moved to Habieta in early May where they briefly manned defensive positions as a precaution against a possible Ottoman attack on the Suez Canal. On 1 June, after a preliminary march to Serapeum, the battalion was moved by rail to Alexandria and boarded the troopship Caledonia, which sailed for France two days later. They docked at Marseille on 9 June, after which they were moved to northern France by rail.

In July and August, the battalion was committed to the fighting along the Western Front for the first time, taking part in the Battle of Pozières, during which it suffered 598 casualties out of its complement of just over 1,000 men. Following this, it undertook a defensive role around Mouquet Farm, before being moved to Flanders where they rotated with the other three battalions of the brigade to man a sector of the line south of Ypres. No major attacks occurred in their sector during this time, and although there were a few casualties, the battalion was able to replace some of its losses, reaching a strength of around 700 men.

After enduring the worst European winter in 40 years, during which they continued to take their turn at the front line, in March 1917 the battalion followed up the Germans as they withdrew towards the Hindenburg Line. A new defensive line was established further west and early the following month the battalion attacked around Bullecourt, suffering 435 casualties. Its next major battle came around Passchendaele in October. With three companies forward and one in reserve, the battalion advanced steadily in its sector, taking over 200 prisoners. As the advance stalled on their left, the battalion was caught in a German counterattack and suffered heavily, losing 369 men killed or wounded, out of the 621 men involved.

After Passchendaele, the battalion was withdrawn out of the line throughout the winter, before being moved to Belgium in January 1918. In March 1918, following the collapse of Russia, the Germans launched the "Spring Offensive", a major operation on the Western Front. As the Allies were pushed back, the 48th Battalion undertook a defensive role around Dernancourt, blocking the Amiens Road, before joining the final Allied offensive around Amiens in August. It was withdrawn from the line in mid-September and did not see action again before the war ended in November. During its last battle, at Le Verguier, north-west of St. Quentin, Private James Woods performed the deeds that resulted in him receiving the Victoria Cross (VC). The 48th Battalion was disbanded on 31 March 1919. During the fighting, it suffered lost 843 killed in action or died on active service and 1,628 wounded.

Members of the battalion received the following decorations: one VC, one Companion of the Order of St Michael and St George, four Distinguished Service Orders, 36 Military Crosses, 23 Distinguished Conduct Medals, 177 Military Medals, three Meritorious Service Medals, eight French Croix de Guerres; one Belgian Croix de Guerre; one Serbian award and one Russian award. A total of 16 battle honours were awarded to the 48th Battalion in 1927 for its involvement in the war.

=== Inter-war years and World War II ===
In 1921, the battalion was re-raised as part the re-organisation of the Australian military that took place at that time. Assigned to the 3rd Military District, the battalion was raised as a part-time unit in Victoria, drawing personnel from the Citizen Forces' 5th Battalion, 24th Infantry Regiment. Following a re-organisation, the Victorian-based 48th Battalion became the 52nd Battalion and the 48th Battalion was re-raised in South Australia from the 32nd Infantry Regiment (Torrens Regiment), which traced its lineage back to the 79th Infantry (Torrens Battalion). In 1927, the battalion adopted the territorial designation of the "Torrens Regiment" and the motto Nunquam Victis, and was officially entrusted with battle honours from World War I. In 1930, an alliance with the Northamptonshire Regiment was formed. Later that year, amidst the austerity of the Great Depression and following the election of the Scullin Labor government, the compulsory training scheme was suspended, and the decision was made to amalgamate the battalion due to a decline in the numbers of volunteers. At this time it was merged with the 43rd Battalion, to become the "43rd/48th Battalion".

Throughout the early part of World War II, these battalions remained linked, undertaking garrison duties in Australia. At the outset of the war, the battalion was assigned to the 3rd Brigade, but it was transferred several times with assignments including the 6th, 31st, 5th, 9th and 28th Brigades. In November 1939, the 43rd/48th Battalion was split and both battalions reformed in their own right. The battalion was mobilised for war service at Warradale following Japan's entry into the war in December 1941, but moved to Woodside, South Australia, later in the month and undertook guard duties at the Loveday Internment Camp for a period.

In early 1942, the 3rd Brigade, less the 48th Battalion, deployed to Darwin; at this time the 48th was transferred to the 6th Brigade and moved to Gherang, Victoria. When the 6th Brigade was sent to Western Australia, the 48th Battalion remained to defence Port Phillip Heads. This lasted until May, when the battalion moved to Narellan, New South Wales, as part of a plan for it to join the 5th Brigade. This did not eventuate as the brigade was sent to Western Australia, and instead the 48th joined the 31st Brigade. Following this, the 48th moved to Ingleburn, where it began converting to an anti-aircraft unit. The battalion's machine gun company was sent to the Northern Territory, though, becoming part of the 19th Machine Gun Battalion. On 27 August 1942, the battalion was amalgamated with the 10th Battalion in Darwin, becoming the "10th/48th Battalion". This was largely an amalgamation in name only, though, as the majority of the previous 48th Battalion personnel were used to form the 108th Light Anti-Aircraft Regiment, consisting of three batteries: the 147th, 148th and 149th. Despite being gazetted as an "AIF" battalion, which meant that it could be deployed outside Australian territory as its personnel volunteered for service overseas, the 10th/48th Battalion did not take part in any fighting during the war and was disbanded on 8 August 1945.

=== Post World War II ===
In 1948, following the demobilisation of Australia's wartime military, the part-time forces were re-raised under the guise of the Citizens Military Force (CMF), but the 48th Battalion was not re-raised until August 1952, forming an amalgamated until with the 43rd Battalion, known as the "43rd/48th Infantry Battalion (The Hindmarsh Regiment)". On 1 July 1960, a widespread re-organisation of the CMF resulted in the creation of six State-based multi-battalion regiments as the smaller, regional regiments of the past were consolidated. As a result, the 43rd/48th Battalion became subsumed into the Pentropic 1st Battalion, Royal South Australia Regiment, providing one company: 'C' (The Mid North Company). Although it was no longer on the Australian Army's order of battle, in 1961, the 48th Battalion was entrusted with the 14 battle honours that the 2/48th Battalion, received for its involvement in the fighting in North Africa, New Guinea and Borneo during World War II.

== Battle honours ==
The 48th Battalion was awarded the following battle honours:

- World War I: Somme 1916–18, Pozières, Bullecourt, Messines 1917, Ypres 1917, Menin Road, Polygon Wood, Passchendaele, Ancre 1918, Hamel, Amiens, Albert 1918, Hindenburg Line, Épehy, France and Flanders 1916–18, Egypt 1915–16.
- World War II: North Africa 1941–42, Defence of Tobruk, El Adem Road, The Salient 1941, Defence of Alamein Line, Tell el Eisa, El Alamein, South-West Pacific 1943–45, Lae–Nadzab, Finschhafen, Defence of Scarlet Beach, Sattelberg, Borneo, Tarakan (inherited).
