= Daniel Poole =

- Born: 21 April 1882; Birkenhead, England
- Died: 13 August 1959 (aged 77); Sydney, Australia
- Military career
- Allegiance: United Kingdom; Australia
- Branch: Royal Navy; Australian Army; Royal Australian Naval Reserve
- Service years: 1909–1918; 1939–1941
- Rank: Sergeant (AIF); Petty Officer (RANR)
- Unit: 20th Battalion
- Conflicts: First World War; Asian and Pacific theatre; Gallipoli Campaign; Western Front; Battle of the Somme; Battle of Pozières; Battle of Arras; Battle of Passchendaele; Second World War
- Awards: Distinguished Conduct Medal & Bar

Daniel Poole DCM & Bar (21 April 1882 – 13 August 1959) was an Australian soldier and sailor. On 15 April 1917, during the battle of Lagnicourt, Poole collected a party of men and led them forward under heavy fire, killing nine enemy and capturing fifteen prisoners. For his leadership and bravery he was awarded the Distinguished Conduct Medal.

== Early life ==
Daniel Poole was born on 21 April 1882 at Birkenhead, England, son of Richard Poole, baker, and his wife Anne, née Warburton. Leaving home at age 11, he worked on a German sailing clipper. He arrived in Sydney in 1909, and subsequently worked as a marine stoker and served for five years with the Royal Naval Reserve. On 13 August 1910, Poole married Mary O'Donnell, a domestic servant and together they had one son. Poole was described as 5 ft 8 ins (173 cm) tall, with fair complexion, blue eyes, fair hair and tattooed on both arms and shoulders. Before joining the army, he gave his trade as marine fireman.

== First World War ==
On 15 August 1914, Poole enlisted in the Australian Naval and Military Expeditionary Force to German New Guinea. Poole returned to Australia with that force and he was discharged on 5 March 1915. Like many other members of the expeditionary force, Poole subsequently enlisted in the Australian Imperial Force on 13 May 1915. Poole was posted to the 20th Battalion, and that unit embarked from Sydney on 26 June 1915, on board HMAT A35 Berrima. On 14 July 1915, he was promoted to lance corporal. The 20th Battalion landed at Gallipoli on 22 August and the unit took up a position at Russell's Top until evacuated on 20 December. The battalion was taken to Egypt for further training and then moved to France, arriving at Marseille on 25 March 1916. He fought at the Somme and in July was involved in the heavy fighting at Pozières. On 16 August 1916, Poole was promoted to temporary sergeant, later confirmed on 1 December.

On 15 April 1917, during the battle of Lagnicourt, Poole gathered a party of volunteers and led them forward under heavy fire, killing nine enemy and capturing fifteen others. For his leadership and bravery he was awarded the Distinguished Conduct Medal. Four days later, on 19 April, he was wounded and evacuated. The award was gazetted on 18 June 1917, with the citation:

1422 Sgt. D. Poole, Infy. For conspicuous gallantry and devotion to duty. He collected a party of men and gallantly led them forward under heavy fire, inflicting many casualties on the enemy and capturing 15 prisoners.

Poole returned to his battalion on 7 September 1917 and he took part in the battle of Menin Road in Belgium. Near Westhoek on 20 September, as the barrage moved across the Hanabreek water course, machine guns in Hannabeek wood came into action and the front wave became slightly disorganised. Major A.K Hosking, M.C. quickly rallied the men in his immediate vicinity and was moving forward with them towards the wood when he was killed by a piece of shell. Many stirring deeds were of the order of the moment, but the berserk spirit of Sergt. D. Poole, D.C.M. appears to have stood out alone, no less than 5 machine guns in Hanabeek wood falling to him. He was the leading spirit in the clearing of the wood. Poole then noticed an enemy machine-gun which had come into action after the barrage and first wave had passed. He rushed the post single handed, captured the gun, killed the crew and took prisoner a large number of men emerging from the pill-box. Although the battalion recommendation was for award of the Victoria Cross, for what was called "reckless leadership", Poole received a Bar to his Distinguished Conduct Medal. On the same day Poole was wounded again and evacuated to Australia, arriving there on 11 January 1918. The Bar was gazetted on 6 February 1918, the citation read:

1422 Sjt. D. Poole, Infy.

For conspicuous gallantry and devotion to duty. This N.C.O. noticing an enemy machine gun which had come into action after the barrage and first wave had passed, immediately rushed the post single-handed, captured the gun, killed the crew, and took prisoners a large number of the enemy emerging from the pill-box. But for the action of this N.C.O., a large number of casualties would have been caused and the advance held up.

(D.C.M. gazetted 18th June, 1917.)

== Post-war and later life ==
Poole was discharged from the Australian Imperial Force on 10 August 1918. He then returned to his work as a seaman working for McIlwraith, McEacharn & Co and from 1937, the Adelaide Steamship Company. On 25 October 1939, Poole reported for duty on mobilisation of the Royal Australian Naval Reserve in World War II. He was allocated to HMAS Manoora, an armed merchant cruiser, as a petty officer stoker. After service in Australian, Papuan, New Guinea and South-West Pacific waters, Poole was discharged as medically unfit on 28 November 1941. He died in Sydney on 28 July 1959 and was cremated after an Anglican service. He was survived by his son.
