= 28th Brigade (Australia) =

Infantry brigade of the Australian Army during World War II

- Active: 1941–1943
- Country: Australia
- Allegiance: Australian Crown
- Branch: Australian Army
- Type: Infantry
- Size: Brigade
- Part of: 1st Division
- Engagements: World War II: Home front

Commanders
- Notable commanders: William Douglas

Insignia
- Unit colour patch

The 28th Brigade was a formation of the Australian Army during World War II. Raised in April 1941, the brigade consisted of Militia units who were assigned to carry out defensive duties on the New South Wales Central Coast. After being mobilised for war in December 1941, the brigade mounted defensive duties throughout 1942 and 1943, defending against a possible Japanese invasion. As this threat passed, the brigade's role diminished throughout 1943. Eventually, the brigade was disbanded in December 1943 having never seen combat. Its constituent units either amalgamated with others, or broken up as reinforcements.

== History ==
The brigade was formed on 8 April 1941, at Ingleburn, New South Wales. Upon formation, the brigade was assigned several part time Militia units – the 34th and 45th Battalions, and the Sydney University Regiment – and was assigned a defensive role around the Wollongong and Port Kembla areas, taking over from the 14th Brigade in this role. Following Japan's entry into the war in December 1941, the brigade's personnel were called up for full time service as the 28th Brigade was mobilised for war amidst concerns of a Japanese invasion. At this time, the brigade was joined by the 13th Garrison Battalion. At this time, the brigade's area of responsibility stretched north from Drummond and Balgownie to cover Wollongong and Port Kembla, to Loftus, to provide cover to Port Hacking and Cronulla, south of Sydney.

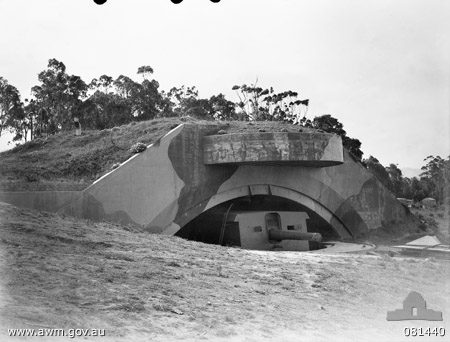
Kembla Fortress area, Drummond Battery, near where elements of the 28th Brigade were stationed

In January 1942, the brigade's headquarters moved from Ingleburn to Mount Keira; at the same time, the brigade was subordinated to the 1st Division. The following month, the brigade's area of responsibility was moved further south, as the 31st Brigade was raised and allocated to the area from Sydney Harbour to Port Hacking. At this time, the 45th Battalion was transferred to the 31st Brigade and was replaced within the 28th Brigade by the 20th Battalion, which moved from Bathurst. While other brigades were temporarily relieved from defensive duties to enable them to undertake a period of intensive training, the 28th Brigade was not afforded this. As a result, the battalions were rotated internally to achieve this. The 13th Garrison Battalion was moved to Brisbane in May 1942, and subsequently the 10th Battalion was transferred from the 3rd Brigade in Adelaide the following month.

New defensive plans were put in place around this time, which shifted the focus upon manning forward defensive positions along beach front areas, to more mobile defensive techniques. As a result, subunits of the 18th Garrison Battalion assumed responsibility of the beach defences, while the infantry battalions undertook training at camps further back at Warrawong, Balgownie and Dapto. They remained there until July 1942 when the brigade moved to Narellan. A further reorganisation took place in August, which saw the 10th Battalion amalgamate with the 48th Battalion, forming the 10th/48th Battalion. Shortly afterwards it was dispatched to Darwin, rotating with the 19th Battalion, which was added to the 28th Brigade's order of battle, although it did not concentrate at Narellan until October 1942 as the battalion's personnel were granted a period of leave.

The 1st Division was reorganised in November 1942, and the 28th Brigade was moved to Rutherford, assuming defensive responsibility for Newcastle from the 1st Brigade. Manpower shortages at this time meant that the brigade's battalions were well below establishment at this time. The 19th Battalion was detached to support the Combined Overseas Training Centre at Gan Gan, although it was later transferred to the 6th Brigade in April 1943 as part of an Army-wide reorganisation to create nine full strength divisions. The 18th Battalion later joined the brigade to take the 19th Battalion's place. This was the final change in the brigade allocated infantry battalions; however, the same month, the brigade's headquarters adopted the designation of "Headquarters Newcastle Force", as it assumed control of anti-aircraft and fixed defences in the Hunter Region for brief period prior to the creation of Headquarters Newcastle Fortress in May 1943. During this time, the brigade came under the direct command of the Second Army, although it was returned to the 1st Division, which was headquartered around Parramatta. The latter half of 1943 was relatively stable for the brigade, although the 34th Battalion moved to Rutherford in August, having been detached to Gateshead in March. This was followed the following month by another move to Seaham, where they were joined by the 20th.

Throughout 1943, a manpower shortage had developed in Australia due to an overmobilisation. As a result, it was decided to disband or amalgamate a number of Militia formations. As a result, in December 1943, the decision was made to disband the brigade and to reallocate its personnel to other formations: the 18th Battalion was transferred to the 1st Brigade, while the 20th and 34th were amalgamated and transferred to the 9th Brigade.

== Units ==
The following units were assigned to the 28th Brigade during the war:

- 34th Battalion
- 45th Battalion (8 April – 11 February 1942)
- Sydney University Regiment (8 April 1941 – 8 December 1942)
- 13th Garrison Battalion (11 December 1941 – 27 May 1942)
- 20th Battalion (from 11 February 1942)
- 10th Battalion (9 June – 23 August 1942)
- 10th/48th Battalion (25 – 26 August 1942)
- 19th Battalion (30 September 1942 – 30 March 1943)
- 18th Battalion (6 September – 9 December 1943)

== Commander ==
The brigade's commander during the majority of its existence was Brigadier William Douglas.

== See also ==
- List of Australian Army brigades
