= 31st Brigade (Australia) =

Infantry brigade of the Australian Army during World War II

- Active: January – September 1942
- Country: Australia
- Allegiance: Australian Crown
- Branch: Australian Army
- Type: Infantry
- Size: Brigade
- Part of: 1st Division; 2nd Division

The 31st Brigade was a formation of the Australian Army during World War II. Raised in January 1942, amidst concerns of a Japanese invasion of Australia, the brigade was tasked with defending the eastern New South Wales coast around Botany Bay and Cronulla. Initially consisting of just two infantry battalions, after several months a third battalion was assigned to bring it up to strength. The formation was only short-lived and was disbanded in September 1942, having never seen combat, with its battalions being reassigned to other formations.

== History ==
The 31st Brigade was formed shortly after Japan's entry into the war, when the Australian government was concerned about the possibility of a Japanese invasion. The brigade opened its headquarters at Burwood, New South Wales, in January 1942, although it moved to Blakehurst the following month. Upon formation, it was assigned to the 1st Division, a Militia formation. Initially consisting of just two infantry battalions, the brigade was tasked with defending the coastal region between Sydney Heads, Botany Bay and Cronulla, with the 1st and 45th Battalions, which had previously been assigned either directly to Headquarters 1st Division, or in the case of the 45th Battalion, to the 28th Brigade. Since the outbreak of the war, the two battalions had been engaged in constructing beach defences in their assigned areas with the 1st Battalion being based around Centennial Park, and the 45th around Loftus until February when the two battalions swapped locations. In March 1942, the brigade was relieved of its defensive duties and construction tasks by the 5th Brigade so that its units could undertake training.

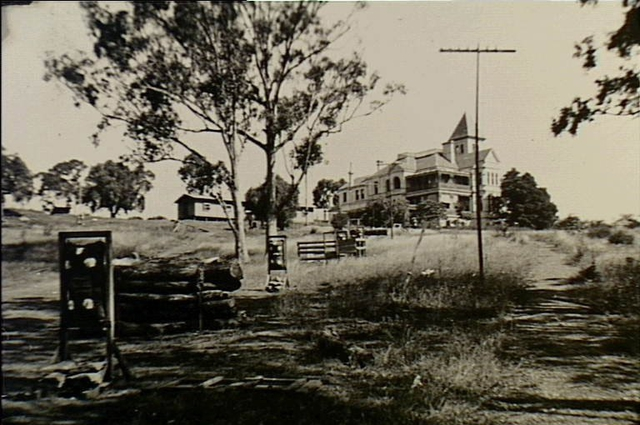
Narellan Camp, where the brigade undertook training in early 1942

Under the command of the 2nd Division, the brigade moved to Narellan to complete training, remaining there until June 1942, when they were rotated back to Blakehurst. At this time, the forward defensive positions along the beach had been taken over by the 18th Garrison Battalion, so the 31st Brigade's troops continued to carry out training, while tasked with mobile defence in the event of an invasion. In May 1942, the 48th Battalion was assigned to the brigade to bring it up to three infantry battalions. In June, the 48th was transferred again, firstly to the 5th Brigade and then later its personnel were used to form an anti-aircraft unit – the 108th Light Anti-Aircraft Regiment – although its designation was used to form an amalgamated unit, designated the 10th/48th Battalion, which served in Darwin.

By late 1942, the Australian government decided to disband or amalgamate a number of infantry battalions and other formations due to manpower shortages in the Australian economy and elsewhere in the Army. A total of eight infantry battalions were disbanded around this time; other formations such as the 10th Division and the 32nd Brigade were also disbanded around this time as the strategic situation in New Guinea eased. The 31st Brigade was disbanded in September 1942. The 1st and 45th Battalions were subsequently amalgamated, and transferred to the 9th Brigade. Although the headquarters of most brigades of the Army that were raised during the war were allocated a Unit Colour Patch, none was assigned to the 31st Brigade. The brigade's commander was Lieutenant Colonel Albert Arnold Brackpool, who assumed the appointment on 22 February 1942, and remained in command until the formation was disbanded. Brackpool was temporarily promoted to colonel in March 1942 and then brigadier in June 1942.

== Units ==
The 31st Brigade consisted of the following units:

- 1st Battalion
- 45th Battalion (from 11 February 1942)
- 48th Battalion (8 May 1942 – 2 June 1942)

== See also ==
- List of Australian Army brigades
