= 20th Battalion (Australia) =

Australian Army infantry battalion

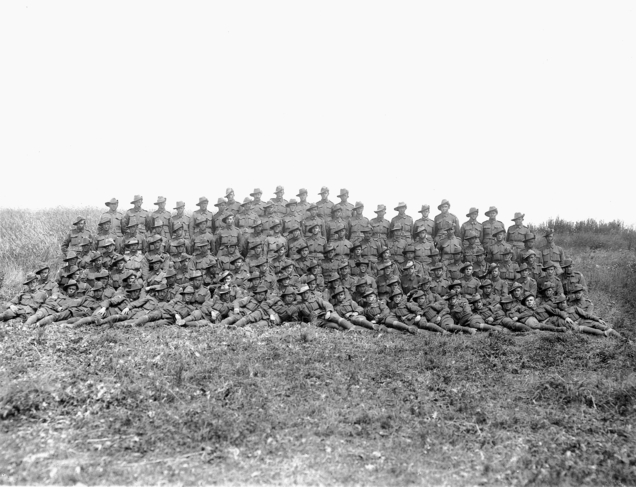
- Non-commissioned officers of the 20th Battalion at Rivery, Somme, June 1918
- Active: 1915–1919; 1921–1929; 1941–1943
- Country: Australia
- Branch: Australian Army
- Type: Infantry
- Size: ~900 – 1,000 men (Note: During World War I, the authorised strength of an Australian infantry battalion was 1,023 men. By the start of World War II, the authorised strength of an Australian infantry battalion was 910 men all ranks, however, later in the war it fell to 803.)
- Part of: 5th Brigade; 28th Brigade
- Motto: Pro Patria
- Colours: White over green
- Engagements: World War I: Gallipoli campaign; Western Front

Insignia
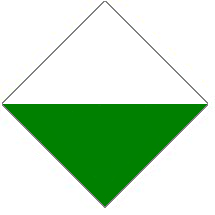
- Unit colour patch

The 20th Battalion was an infantry battalion of the Australian Army. Raised in early 1915 as part of the Australian Imperial Force, it was attached to the 5th Brigade, 2nd Division that served during World War I. The battalion first saw action during the Gallipoli campaign, before being evacuated in December 1915. After that the 20th Battalion was sent to France where they served in the trenches along the Western Front. Over the course of the next two years, they fought in many major battles, including the battles of the Hundred Days Offensive at the end of the war. The 20th Battalion's last engagement was at Montbrehain in October 1918. Following the end of the war, it was disbanded in April 1919. It was later re-raised in 1921, although it was amalgamated in 1929 due to manpower shortages. During World War II the battalion was briefly re-raised and carried out garrison duties in Australia.

== History ==
=== World War I ===
The 20th Battalion was raised in March 1915 in Liverpool, New South Wales, as part of the Australian Imperial Force (AIF). A small number of its original recruits had already served with the Australian Naval and Military Expeditionary Force in New Guinea in 1914. After undertaking initial training, the battalion left Australia in June and after a further period of training in Egypt they landed at Anzac Cove on 22 August 1915 as part of the 5th Brigade, 2nd Division. They played only a minor part in the fighting during the August Offensive which was coming to a close by the time they arrived and so for the majority of time that they were at Gallipoli, the battalion was deployed in the defence of Russell's Top. They remained on the peninsula until the evacuation on 20 December 1915.

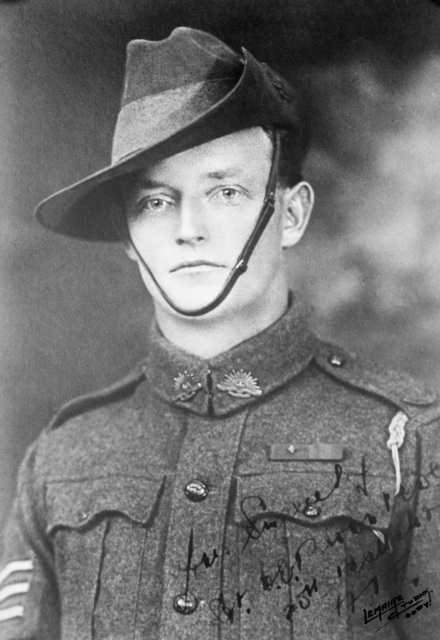
Walter Brown, who received the Victoria Cross following the fighting around Villers-Bretonneux, July 1918

Following further training in Egypt, the 20th Battalion was sent to France, arriving there on 22 March 1916. From there it proceeded to a position near Pozières, where it took up position in the trenches in April and, a month later, had the dubious honour of being the first Australian battalion to be raided by the Germans. Later, in July and August the 20th took part in the Battle of Pozières, during which time it served in the line twice before moving to a quieter sector in Belgium for a period of rest. In October, however, the entire 2nd Division was moved to the south again and put back into the line in France once again and in November they launched an attack at Flers, in conditions that were so muddy that they were described by the official historian, Charles Bean, as "the worst ever encountered by the AIF".

Throughout 1917 the 20th Battalion was involved in three major battles as the German Army was forced back towards the Hindenburg Line, seeing action at Bullecourt in May, Menin Road in September and Poelcappelle in October. At Lagnicourt, on 15 April, along with other units from the 5th Brigade, they took part in a defensive action along with four other battalions, where they managed to defeat a counter-attack by a German force almost five times its size. In 1918, the battalion was involved in repelling the German spring offensive, when the 20th was one of many Australian battalions that were hurried in to the line to stop it, and on 7 April 1918, they took part in a very sharp engagement at Hangard Wood. Once the German offensive was defeated, the Allies launched their own, known as the Hundred Days Offensive which eventually brought about an end to the war. During this time the 20th were involved in the battles at Amiens and Mont St Quentin in August, before participating in the attack on the "Beaurevoir Line" at Montbrehain in October.

This would be the battalion's last contribution to the war, as it was training out of the line when the Armistice was declared in November 1918. It was disbanded on 20 April 1919 while at Montigny-le-Tilluel, Belgium, when most of its personnel, including the commanding officer, Lieutenant Colonel Frederick Forbes, were marched out for repatriation to Australia as part of the demobilisation process. During the war, the 20th Battalion lost 848 men killed and 3,143 men wounded. The battalion's sole Victoria Cross recipient was Walter Brown, who received the decoration for his actions around Villers-Bretonneux on 6 July 1918. For the battalion's involvement in the war, it received a total of 20 battle honours.

=== Inter war years and World War II ===
In 1921, Australia's part-time military force, the Citizens Force (later known as the Militia), was re-organised to perpetuate the numerical designations and structure of the AIF. At this time the 20th Battalion was re-raised in New South Wales, around Parramatta, and was again placed under the command of the 5th Brigade, 2nd Division. Upon formation, the new 20th Battalion drew personnel from the 20th Infantry Regiment, and through this link it inherited two battle honours: "Suakin 1885" and "South Africa 1899–1902". Territorial designations were introduced in 1927, at which point the battalion adopted the title of the "Parramatta and Blue Mountains Regiment"; at the same time the motto of Pro Patria was approved.

In 1929, following the suspension of the compulsory training scheme by the newly elected Scullin Labor government, financial pressures and manpower shortages resulted in a number of battalions being amalgamated. The 20th Battalion was one of those chosen, and it merged with the 54th, although they were later delinked. An alliance with the Lancashire Fusiliers was approved in 1937. In 1939, the 20th Battalion merged with the 19th Battalion to become the 20th/19th Battalion, adopting the territorial designation of the "Parramatta and Blue Mountains Regiment".

Following the outbreak of World War II, the 20th/19th Battalion was transferred from Sydney to Darwin in the Northern Territory, where they were to form part of the town's garrison. These two battalions were delinked on 1 November 1941 as part of the expansion of the Australian military following Japan's entry into the war. The 20th/19th Battalion's machine gunners later formed part of the 6th Machine Gun Battalion. At the split, the 20th Battalion was assigned once again to the 5th Brigade, although in February 1942 they were transferred to the 28th Brigade. With the 28th Brigade, the 20th Battalion undertook defensive duties around Port Kembla and Seaham in New South Wales. Nevertheless, as a result of a manpower shortage in the Australian economy, the government decided to disband or amalgamate a number of Militia units throughout 1942–43, and on 13 December 1943, the 20th merged with the 34th to form the 20th/34th Battalion. This unit remained in existence until it was disbanded on 6 April 1944. Although the 20th Battalion received no battle honours for direct involvement in combat during World War II, in 1961 it was entrusted with the three battle honours bestowed upon the 2/20th Battalion for their involvement in the Malayan Campaign.

== Battle honours ==
For its service during the war, the 20th Battalion received the following battle honours:

- Suakin 1885 (inherited);
- South Africa 1899–1902 (inherited);
- World War I: Suvla, Gallipoli 1915–16, Egypt 1915–16, Somme 1916–18, Pozières, Bapaume 1917, Bullecourt, Ypres 1917, Menin Road, Polygon Wood, Broodseinde, Poelcappelle, Passchendaele, Hamel, Amiens, Albert 1918, Mont St Quentin, Hindenburg Line, Beaurevoir, France and Flanders 1916–18.
- World War II: Malaya 1941–42, Johore, Singapore Island (inherited).

== Commanding officers ==
- Lieutenant Colonel John Lamrock. (Note: Lamrock later achieved the rank of brigadier general.)
- Lieutenant Colonel Alexander Windeyer Ralston.
- Lieutenant Colonel Alfred Joshua Bennett.
- Lieutenant Colonel Frederick William Dempster Forbes.

== See also ==
- List of Australian Victoria Cross recipients
- Daniel Poole

== Notes ==
Footnotes

Citations
