= Raymond Leane =

Australian Military General

Brigadier General Sir Raymond Leane CB, CMG, DSO & Bar, MC, VD, JP
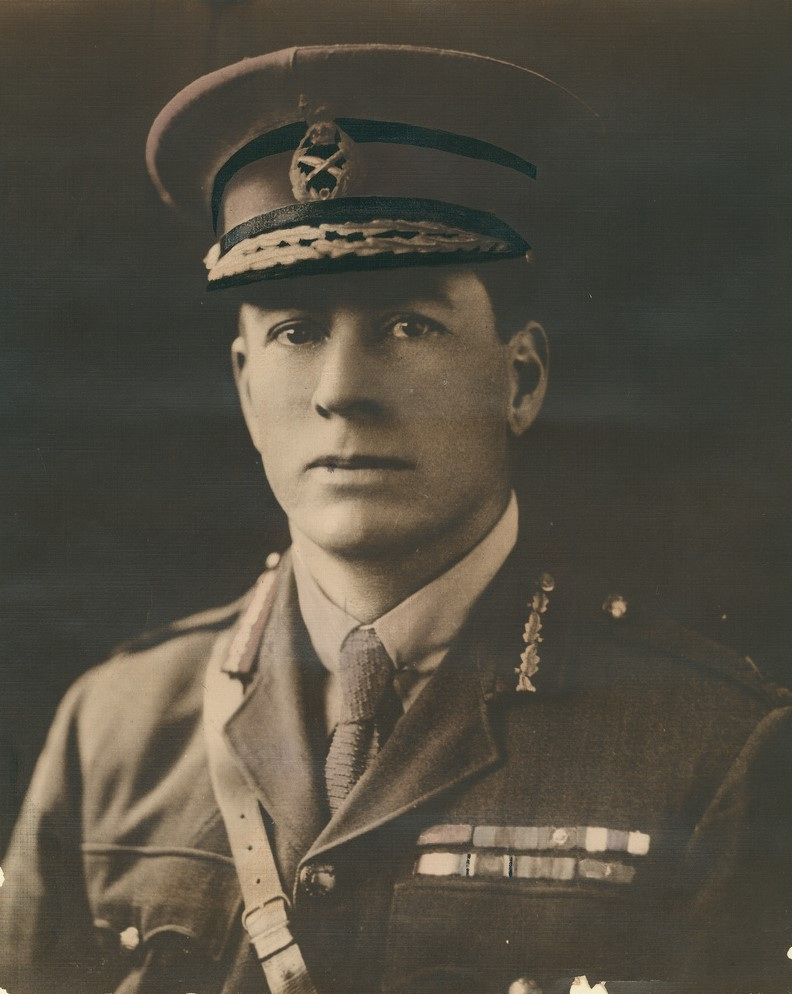
- Born: Raymond Lionel Leane; 12 July 1878; Prospect, South Australia
- Died: 25 June 1962 (aged 83); Adelaide, South Australia
- Military career
- Allegiance: Australia
- Branch: Australian Army
- Service years: 1905–1938, 1940–1944
- Rank: Brigadier General
- Nickname: The Bull
- Commands: 11th Battalion (1915); 48th Battalion (1916–1918); 12th Brigade (1918–1919); 19th Brigade (1920–1921); 3rd Brigade (1921–1926)
- Conflicts: World War I; Gallipoli Campaign; Battle of Pozières; First Battle of Bullecourt; First Battle of Passchendaele; German spring offensive; Hundred Days Offensive; World War II
- Awards: Knight Bachelor; Companion of the Order of the Bath; Companion of the Order of St Michael and St George; Distinguished Service Order & Bar; Military Cross; Mention in Despatches (8); Croix de guerre (France)
- Other work: Commissioner of South Australia Police

Brigadier General Sir Raymond Lionel Leane, CB, CMG, DSO & Bar, MC, VD, JP (12 July 1878 – 25 June 1962) was an Australian Army officer who rose to command the 48th Battalion then 12th Brigade during World War I. For his performance during the war, Leane was described by the Australian Official War Historian Charles Bean as "the foremost fighting leader" in the Australian Imperial Force (AIF), and "the head of the most famous family of soldiers in Australian history", among other accolades. After the war, he served as Commissioner of the South Australia Police from 1920 to 1944, for which he was knighted.

A businessman and part-time Citizen Forces officer before the war, Leane was commissioned into the AIF and led a company of the 11th Infantry Battalion at the landing at Anzac Cove, Gallipoli, on 25 April 1915. He rose to temporarily command his battalion, and was made a Companion of the Distinguished Service Order (DSO), awarded the Military Cross, twice mentioned in despatches and wounded three times during the Gallipoli campaign. After returning to Egypt, the AIF was re-organised, and Leane was appointed as the commanding officer of the newly formed 48th Battalion, which soon after was transported to the Western Front in France and Belgium. Important battles that the 48th were involved in under his command included the Battle of Pozières in 1916, and the First Battle of Bullecourt and First Battle of Passchendaele in 1917. During the latter battle, he was severely wounded. During 1916–1917, he was mentioned in despatches three more times, was made a Companion of the Order of St Michael and St George and awarded a bar to his DSO.

After recuperating, in early 1918 he returned to his battalion and led it during the German spring offensive of March and April 1918, which included heavy fighting near Dernancourt, for which he was again mentioned in despatches. As a battalion commander, he proved a difficult subordinate, disobeying the orders of his brigade commanders at both Pozières and Dernancourt. In June 1918 he was promoted to colonel and temporary brigadier general to command the 12th Brigade, which he led during the Battle of Amiens in August, and the fighting to capture the Hindenburg Outpost Line in September. He was mentioned in despatches a further two times after the conclusion of the war, and in early 1919 was also awarded the French Croix de guerre, and made a Companion of the Order of the Bath for his "gallant and able" leadership while commanding the 12th Brigade. During the war, four of his brothers and six of his nephews served; two brothers and two nephews were killed.

After helping oversee the repatriation of soldiers back to Australia, Leane returned home to South Australia in late 1919. In May the following year he was selected as the next Commissioner of the South Australia Police, taking up the appointment in July. His appointment was initially controversial within the force, as there had been an established practice of selecting the commissioner from within its ranks. Leane also returned to part-time soldiering, commanding at the brigade level until 1926, not without controversy. His administration of the police force was generally praised, although he did have to weather several storms, one of which involved a Royal Commission into bribery of some of his officers by bookmakers. He was a foundation member and inaugural president of the Legacy Club of Adelaide, established to assist the dependents of deceased ex-servicemen. In 1928, during a major dispute over the industrial award applying to waterfront labourers, Leane provided police protection to non-union workers, and on one occasion personally led a force of 150 police that successfully confronted a crowd of 2,000 waterside labourers who wanted to remove non-union workers from Adelaide ports. As commissioner, he introduced a number of innovations, including cadets and probationary training for young recruits, police dogs, and traffic accident analysis. After the outbreak of World War II, despite being on the retired list, Leane became the state commander of the Returned and Services League-organised Volunteer Defence Corps, a form of home guard, in addition to his duties as commissioner. After retiring in 1944, he was knighted for his services during 24 years at the head of the police force. In retirement he became involved in conservative politics, and remained active with returned servicemen's associations until his death in 1962.

== Early life and career ==
Raymond Lionel Leane was born on 12 July 1878 in Prospect, South Australia, the son of a shoemaker, Thomas John Leane, and his wife Alice née Short, who were of Cornish descent. One of eight children, he was educated at North Adelaide Public School until age 12, when he went to work for a retail and wholesale business, which sent him to Albany, Western Australia. He later moved to Claremont. In June 1902, Leane married Edith Louise Laybourne, a sister of the architect Louis Laybourne Smith. He and Edith lived at Claremont for six years, during which he served on the local council from 1903 to 1906. His interest in the military led to Leane being commissioned as a lieutenant in the 11th (Perth Rifles) Infantry Regiment, a unit of the part-time Citizen Forces in 1905. In 1908, he bought a retail business in Kalgoorlie and transferred to the Goldfields Infantry Regiment. He was promoted to captain on 21 November 1910.

== World War I ==
On 25 August 1914, Leane joined the newly formed Australian Imperial Force (AIF) as a company commander in the Western Australia-raised 11th Infantry Battalion of the 3rd Brigade, with the rank of captain. The AIF was established as Australia's expeditionary force to fight in the war, as the Citizen Forces were restricted to home defence per the Defence Act 1903. When the battalion was formed, he was appointed to command F Company. The battalion embarked for overseas in October and sailed to Egypt, arriving in early December. On 1 January 1915, the unit was re-organised into four companies to mirror the British Army battalion structure, and a new C Company was created by combining E and F Companies. Leane was chosen to command the new C Company.

=== Gallipoli campaign ===
After several months training in Egypt, the 3rd Brigade first saw action as the covering force for the landing at Anzac Cove, Gallipoli, on 25 April 1915 and so was the first brigade ashore about 04:30. Leane's C Company was in the first wave, and landed just to the north of the Ari Burnu headland then climbed it to Plugge's Plateau. By noon on 30 April, the 1,000-strong 11th Battalion had suffered casualties amounting to nine officers and 369 men. Four days later, Leane was chosen to lead an amphibious assault on Gaba Tepe, a prominent headland south of the Anzac perimeter on which an Ottoman-held fort was situated. The troops occupying the fort were directing artillery fire onto the positions around Anzac Cove. Landing from boats on the beach at the foot of Gaba Tepe, the force consisted of over 110 men from the 11th Battalion and 3rd Field Company. The force was promptly pinned down on the beach by heavy fire. Leane signalled the Royal Navy to remove his wounded from the beach, which they did with a steamboat towing a rowboat. Having determined that the withdrawal along the beach was impossible owing to belts of barbed wire, Leane then signalled the Royal Navy to remove the rest of his party. The Navy sent two picket boats towing two ships' boats. Destroyers laid down covering fire, but while the Ottomans had held their fire for the evacuation of the wounded, they laid down tremendous fire on the withdrawing raiders. Many men were hit, including Leane, who was wounded in the hand. The raid was a failure, but Leane's leadership, courage and coolness under fire had impressed, and he was awarded the Military Cross (MC) for his actions. The recommendation from his commanding officer read:

This officer displayed bravery and skill on the morning of the 4th of May while in command of the landing party at Gaba Tepe, and especially in the manner in which he withdrew his force with very little loss when an advance was found impossible.

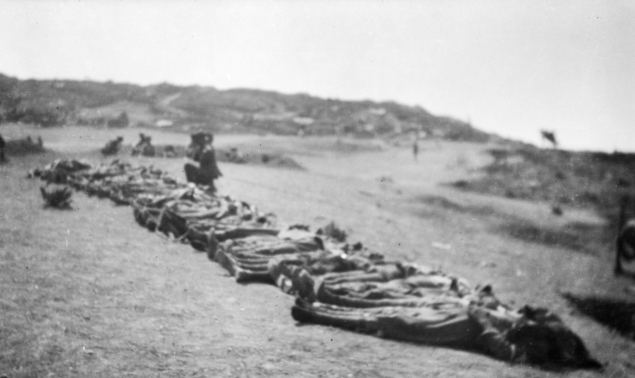
The bodies of the 36 members of the 11th Battalion killed during the capture of Leane's Trench

Following the raid on Gaba Tepe, Leane rejoined his battalion in the main defensive line around the beachhead. Before dawn on 19 May, elements of the Ottoman 16th Division attacked the 3rd Brigade positions on Bolton's Ridge as part of a wider counterattack against the Anzac sector. During the fighting, Leane was located in a forward sap of the battalion trenches overlooking a gully where the Ottoman troops were congregating. From this position, Leane and two other 11th Battalion men killed a large number of Ottoman troops with their rifles, firing from dawn until noon. On 28 June, Leane's company went forward of Bolton's Ridge towards Turkey Knoll to provide covering fire for an abortive attack by the 9th Battalion on Ottoman trenches on Sniper's Ridge. This attack was a feint, intended to distract the Ottoman commanders from reinforcing their troops opposite an Allied attack at Cape Helles far to the south. The forward company position was completely untenable, the lead elements of Leane's company were raked by shrapnel and machine gun fire, and Leane was wounded in the face. Despite this, he remained with his unit. The two companies of the 11th Battalion that were committed to support the attack lost 21 killed and 42 wounded.

During the night of 31 July, Leane led an assault on an Ottoman trench opposite Tasmania Post, which was held by the 11th Battalion. The attack was prompted by a desire to give the Ottomans the impression that an attempt was going to be made to break out of the Anzac perimeter to the south, while a landing was planned at Suvla Bay far to the north. Leane's force consisted of four parties of 50 men, who were to assault the Ottoman trench after the firing of four mines that had been dug up to the enemy trench. Initially only the northernmost and southernmost of the mines exploded, but Leane led out the attack regardless. While the parties were covering the distance between Tasmania Post and the Ottoman trench, a third mine exploded, possibly burying some members of one of the assaulting groups. The fourth mine failed to explode. Stiff fighting occurred at some points of the objective trench, but the Ottomans were routed and the trench was consolidated and communication trenches leading towards the Ottoman rear were barricaded. Several desperate bomb fights occurred at the barricades. Work immediately began to convert the mine tunnels into communication trenches leading to the newly captured trench. There were some feeble counterattacks. At dawn, Ottoman artillery began an intense bombardment of the newly won position. During the shelling, Leane was speaking to an observer as an enemy shell landed. The observer was decapitated and Leane was wounded in the head, but remained at his post. The position captured during this operation became known as "Leane's Trench". While capturing the trench, the 11th Battalion had lost 36 killed and 73 wounded.

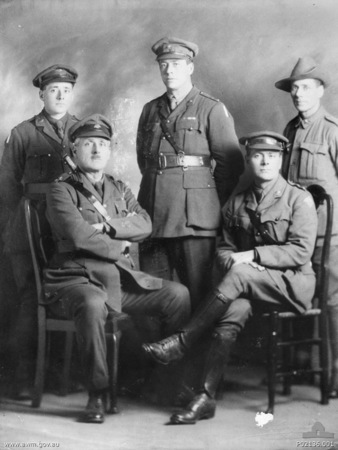
Five of the six Leane brothers served in World War I Left to right – standing: Major Benjamin Leane; Lieutenant Colonel Raymond Leane; Warrant Officer Class One Ernest Leane seated: Major Edwin Leane; and Major Allan Leane

Leane was promoted to temporary major on 5 August while recuperating in hospital on the island of Lemnos. He rejoined his unit four days later and was recommended to be made a Companion of the Distinguished Service Order (DSO), the second highest award for acts of gallantry by officers, for his "great gallantry, coolness and dash". He temporarily commanded the 11th Infantry Battalion from 30 September, and was promoted to substantive major and temporary lieutenant colonel on 8 October. Leane remained at Gallipoli until the battalion was evacuated to Lemnos on 16 November. He was admitted to hospital with pneumonia in late November, and was evacuated to Egypt, finally being discharged in early February 1916. For his service during the campaign, in addition to his MC and DSO, he was twice mentioned in despatches. He also became known by the nickname "The Bull". As the Official Australian War Historian Charles Bean observed, his "tall square-shouldered frame, immense jaw, tightly compressed lips, and keen, steady, humorous eyes made him the very figure of a soldier".

=== Western Front ===
On discharge from hospital, Leane initially returned to the 11th Battalion, but on 21 February 1916 was transferred to be the commanding officer of the planned 48th Infantry Battalion. The 48th Battalion was assigned to the 12th Brigade, part of the 4th Division. Leane was substantively promoted to lieutenant colonel on 12 March, and the battalion itself was raised four days later. Like Leane himself, the 48th was both South Australian and Western Australian, having been raised from a cadre drawn from the 16th Battalion reinforced by fresh recruits from Australia. Serving in the battalion were a number of Leane's relatives, including his younger brother, Benjamin Bennett Leane, who was initially his adjutant and later his second-in-command. There were also three of his nephews in the battalion (Allan Edwin, Reuben Ernest and Geoffrey Paul Leane), and several other relatives. The 48th became known throughout the AIF as the "Joan of Arc Battalion" because it was "made of All-Leanes" (Maid of Orleans). Throughout March and April 1916, the battalion undertook training in the desert before being moved to Habieta in early May where they briefly manned defensive positions as a precaution against a possible Ottoman attack on the Suez Canal. On 1 June, after a preliminary march to Serapeum, the battalion was moved by rail to Alexandria and boarded the troopship Caledonia, which sailed for France two days later. They docked at Marseille on 9 June, after which they were moved to northern France by rail.

==== Pozières and Mouquet Farm ====
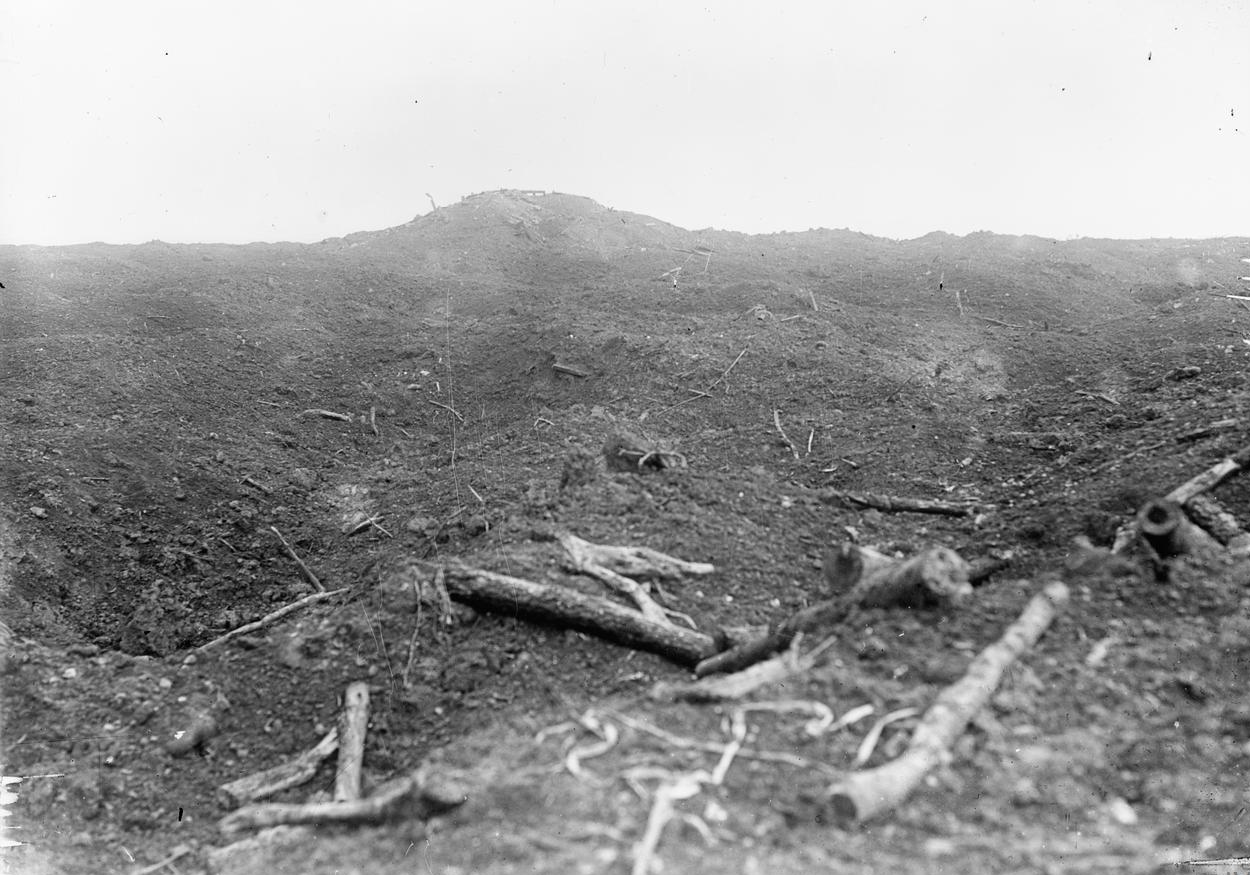
The site of the Windmill at Pozières, near which the 48th Battalion suffered over 50% casualties during 5–7 August 1916

After the battalion moved to France, its first serious fighting was during the Battle of Pozières on the night of 5/6 August, when it was committed to defend ground captured by the Australian 2nd Division. On receiving his orders, Leane immediately reconnoitred the position with his company commanders, during which they were pinned down by a German barrage and two of them were wounded. His brigade commander, Brigadier General Duncan Glasfurd and his superior commanders believed that a strong German counterattack would follow the tremendous barrage then falling on the Australian-held positions. Glasfurd therefore ordered Leane to place two companies north of Pozières, but Leane was convinced that this would overcrowd the area and result in needless casualties. His plan was to garrison his two trenches with one company each and hold his two reserve companies well to the rear of the village and he confronted Glasfurd and demanded written orders. Glasfurd then gave Leane a written order that his two reserve companies were to be sent forward, but Leane remained defiant, stationing only one company north of Pozières. According to Bean, while disobedience of orders is a dangerous practice in general, in this case later events proved that Leane was fully justified in this action. According to the historian Craig Deayton, Leane was already the dominant influence in the brigade, and was proving to be a "difficult subordinate" for Glasfurd. Leane was not alone in his approach, as the commanding officer of the flanking 14th Battalion, Lieutenant Colonel Charles Dare, adopted the same disposition and disobeyed his own brigade commander in doing so. Leane later described the relief of the previous garrison as the worst he experienced in the whole war, conducted as it was under a tremendous German bombardment. When he visited his front lines in the early morning, he found remnants of his two companies, scattered among shell holes rather than trenches, and surrounded by dead and wounded.

By mid-afternoon on 6 August, it was apparent from the continuing heavy shelling that a German counterattack was to be expected. The two front line companies had suffered heavy losses, and, according to Bean, Leane's decision to retain a company in the rear of the village was shown to be a wise one. That evening he relieved his two forward companies with the reserve company, leaving the other company north of the village. About 04:00 on 7 August a full scale German counterattack developed, which threatened to overrun the 48th Battalion. Leane committed half of his remaining company, and this helped to resolve the situation. Leane's battalion was relieved in the afternoon. Leane's refusal to follow Glasfurd's orders has been described as flowing from "conspicuous common sense and great moral courage", but Deayton observes that the fact that no inquiry was undertaken after the battle was a failing by Leane's chain of command, which effectively gave Leane licence to disobey orders in future. The relationship between Glasfurd and Leane did not recover from this clash. Deayton further observes that if the German assault had been launched a day earlier, and the forward trenches lost, even temporarily, Leane would likely have been brought to account for his disobedience. In just one day and two nights of battle, the 48th Battalion lost 20 officers and 578 men, mainly from shell fire. The battalion returned to the line at Pozières on 12–15 August, losing another 89 casualties. Following this, the battalion undertook a defensive role around Mouquet Farm, before being moved to Flanders where they rotated with the other three battalions of the 12th Brigade to man a sector of the line south of Ypres. No major attacks occurred in their sector during this time, and although there were a few casualties, the battalion was able to replace some of its losses, reaching a strength of around 700 men. Leane was again mentioned in despatches, this time for "consistent, thorough and good work in raising and training his battalion" and his command of his unit at Pozières and Mouquet Farm.

==== Bullecourt ====
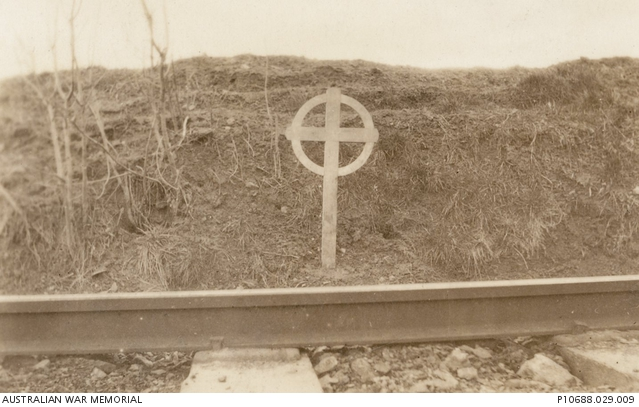
The original grave of Benjamin Leane, Raymond Leane's younger brother

During the worst European winter in 40 years, the 48th Battalion continued to take its turn at the front line, and Leane was mentioned in despatches for the fourth time. In March 1917 his battalion followed up the Germans as they withdrew towards the multi-layered Hindenburg Line of fortifications. In early April 1917, the 12th Brigade was committed to an attack aimed at capturing Bullecourt, with the 48th Battalion given the task of capturing the secondary objective, following behind the 46th Battalion. During the preparations, due to a misunderstanding, Leane was ordered by his brigade commander to send 200 troops into the village of Bullecourt, which Leane believed to be well defended. Characteristically, Leane insisted that if the order must be carried out, it would involve the destruction of one of his companies, and he would have to choose that commanded by his nephew Allan. The timely arrival of a divisional staff officer clarified the situation, and the order was cancelled. On the morning of 10 April, the battalion was formed up for the attack when the promised tank support failed to arrive on time, and the assault was postponed. During the withdrawal back to the front line, Leane's brother, Major Benjamin Leane – now the second-in-command of the unit – was killed by shell fire, and the battalion suffered another 20 casualties. Leane found Ben's body among the dead, and carried him to a spot where he dug a grave before erecting a cross above it.

The postponed attack was rescheduled for the following day, and despite further problems with the tank support, the 48th Battalion was able to push through to the second line of German trenches in the Hindenburg Line east of Bullecourt. The position was considered to be secure if close artillery support was provided. But mistaken artillery and air observers insisted that they had seen Australian troops beyond the Hindenburg Line, messages from the forward battalions did not get back to their higher headquarters, and the artillery commanders would not bring down the protective barrage needed. Reinforcements were unable to get through in sufficient strength. When a large-scale German counterattack developed, the 48th Battalion was almost cut off in the captured German trenches, and had to fight their way out, taking heavy casualties in the process. Of the around 750 men of the battalion involved in the attack, the unit lost 15 officers and 421 men. Leane's nephew Allan, who had led the fight in the captured German trench, was captured after being wounded and later died in a German hospital. The Australian commanders were scathing of the tanks, blaming them almost entirely for the failure, with Leane even accusing the tank crews of "cowardice and incompetence".

==== Messines, Polygon Wood and Passchendaele ====
The battalion was next involved in serious fighting during the Battle of Messines. Although in a supporting role for the brigade's initial advance on 7 June, its companies were soon committed to reinforce the leading battalions. They continued to fight the Germans until 10 June when they were withdrawn so that the battalion could be re-organised as a whole. Later the same day the battalion was recommitted to the front line. The following morning, with characteristic aggression, Leane pushed a strong fighting patrol forward at dawn, working on his assumption that the trenches and strong points opposite the battalion were only being held at night, with the German garrison being withdrawn during the day. He proved to be right, and the German positions were captured without a fight, along with two field guns and a large quantity of ammunition. This action secured the brigade objective and linked up the 12th Brigade with the 13th Brigade on its left. Up until the battalion was withdrawn from the battle on 12 June, it had lost 4 officers and 62 men. Leane was recommended for a bar to his DSO after Messines for "clever handling" of his battalion, but he did not receive that award. The battalion rotated through rest, reserve positions and the front line until the Battle of Polygon Wood in September. During this battle it was in a support role, engaged mainly in salvage in rear areas, but nevertheless suffered 27 casualties from heavy shell fire. Soon after, Leane was recommended to be made a Companion of the Order of St Michael and St George (CMG). The recommendation read:

For indefatigable energy and zeal as a leader during the period 26 February to 20 September 1917. This officer displayed extreme courage when in command of his battalion during the attack at Bullecourt on 10 April 1917 and in the Messines battle on 7 June 1917 he handled his men with great skill and success. During the trying times after heavy casualties he has displayed great initiative and has succeeded in quickly reorganising his command and rendering it fit for further action. Lieutenant Colonel Leane is an officer of great courage and the success that has always attended the efforts of his battalion are due to his strong personality and example.

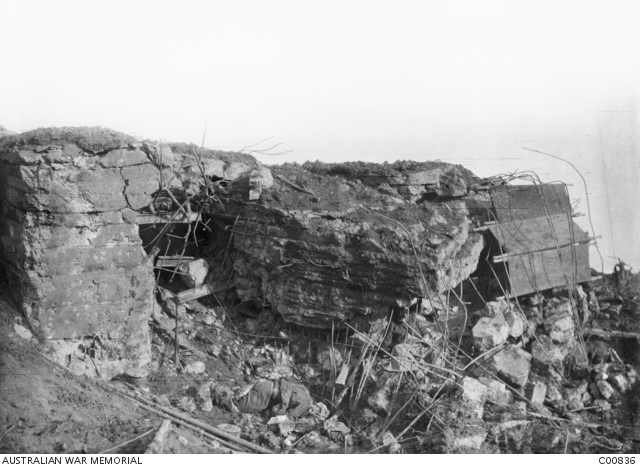
A destroyed German pillbox similar to the one near which Leane was severely wounded

The battalion was next committed on the right flank of the main attack during the First Battle of Passchendaele on 12 October. Despite initial success and the capture of more than 200 Germans, the main attack failed, leaving the left flank of the battalion exposed. The first German counterattack was beaten off, but with its left flank unprotected, the second counterattack pushed the 48th Battalion back to its start line. During the fighting, the unit suffered 370 casualties from its original complement of 621. During the withdrawal, Leane was directing his unit from his headquarters near an old German pillbox when the area came under heavy German bombardment. A shell landed less than 10 metres (11 yd) in front of him, Leane was severely wounded in the leg and hand, and was evacuated to England for treatment. He was again recommended for a bar to his DSO, this time successfully. The recommendation read:

For conspicuous gallantry and devotion to duty. Although suffering extreme agony from an acute attack of neuritis he insisted, against his Medical Officer's advice, in commanding his battalion in the attack. After his battalion had been forced to retire owing to enemy counterattack on his battalion's flank, which was consequently left unprotected, he went forward under a very heavy artillery barrage and collected stragglers and parties of men who were retiring past their original line and organised them and sent them forward again to assist in repulsing the enemy. His rapid grasp of the situation and his capable dispositions made personally insured the retention of the front against the advancing enemy. He continued to handle his battalion under a massive barrage and remained at his post though badly wounded until the enemy were checked and the defence assured.

==== German Spring Offensive ====
On 26 January 1918, Leane rejoined his battalion, having recuperated from his wounds. His CMG and bar to the DSO had been announced while he was away, as had his fifth mention in despatches. For almost the whole period of his absence, the 48th Battalion had been absorbing replacements, resting and training in rear areas, only returning to its rotation through to the front lines, reserve trenches and rest areas in mid-January. Even its brief periods in the front line had been quiet, mainly engaged in improving trenches and other defences. In mid-February the battalion moved to billets near Meteren where it remained until 25 March. On that day the 724-strong 48th Battalion was picked up by truck and sent south to help meet the German spring offensive, which had only been launched four days earlier, meeting with resounding success. After debussing north of Berles-au-Bois, the battalion marched into that village and took up positions. The following afternoon they were ordered to march through the night another 19 kilometres (12 mi) further south to Senlis-le-Sec, arriving there on the morning of 27 March. After a brief stop they continued on through Hénencourt and east to Millencourt, due west of Albert.

===== First Dernancourt =====
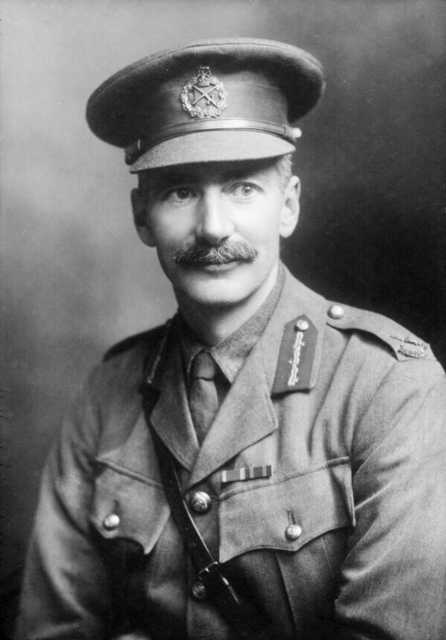
At Dernancourt, Leane disobeyed orders given by Brigadier General John Gellibrand (pictured)

The 12th Brigade was initially placed under the command of the 9th (Scottish) Division, responsible for holding the front line west of Albert, which had fallen into German hands. At this point, a breathless British staff officer appeared, stating that Dernancourt had fallen, and the Germans held the railway line in front of Albert. His orders were to guide the battalion into support positions on high ground behind the remnants of the 9th Division. Under Leane's stern gaze and questioning, he was unable to give the name of the commander of the 12th Brigade, Brigadier General John Gellibrand, who had apparently issued the orders, and due to rumours that alarms and false orders were being spread by Germans dressed as British staff officers, Leane detained him as a suspected spy. Leane went to find Gellibrand himself, found that the orders were correct, and the staff officer was released. After this delay in deployment, Leane directed his battalion east along the line of the Albert–Amiens road to the heights behind the 9th Division, which it reached in the early afternoon of 27 March.

Gellibrand then ordered the 48th Battalion, and the 47th Battalion on its right, to immediately take up positions on the forward slope of the high ground and push posts forward to the railway embankment below. The forward slope was in full view of the approaching Germans. The 47th moved forward immediately, came under heavy German shelling, and suffered casualties in moving as far as an old half-completed trench some 350 metres (380 yd) short of the railway line by 17:00. Leane took the view that Gellibrand did not know the full situation on the ground, and that he had the discretion to follow a course of action that would achieve the objective without unnecessary casualties. He decided not to move his troops forward until dark. Bean remarks on Leane again disobeying orders, but notes that the dangers of such action are mitigated when such subordinates, like Leane, have "outstanding qualities of courage and judgement". He concludes, "[b]ut Leane was Leane, and Gellibrand had the sense to know it". Deayton criticises Leane's decision, describing his failure to advise the 47th Battalion of his intentions as "inexcusable", and stating that the serious risk created by Leane's decision could have resulted in a disaster had there been a German attack that afternoon. Deayton also reflects that this was only the latest in a series of clashes between Leane and Gellibrand since the latter had taken over the brigade in November of the previous year.

After dark, the 48th Battalion took over the line from the remainder of the 9th Division. The 47th Battalion was still on its right, and on the left was the British V Corps. The 48th Battalion occupied a small salient between Albert and Dernancourt. During the night, desultory artillery and machine gun fire was directed at the battalion's positions. In the early morning light of 28 March, the forward two companies could make out German infantry advancing through the fog. They approached without the coverage of a barrage, and in quite close formation, some had their rifles slung. The men of the 48th Battalion quickly brought their weapons to bear and the Germans stopped advancing. A minor break through on the right-flanking 47th Battalion was quickly dealt with and thirty prisoners taken. During the day, the Germans advanced another eight times, each time more cautiously and with a little more fire support. But each time the Australians beat them back. By evening the Germans appeared to have withdrawn, and the 48th Battalion had suffered the loss of 62 men. That night and the next two days passed relatively quietly, with Leane rotating his companies through the front line posts, with characteristic care not to create congestion in the forward areas. The battalion was relieved on the night of 30 March.

===== Second Dernancourt =====
The 48th Battalion returned to its former positions on the railway embankment on the night of 3 April, in their absence the line had been subjected to two more German attacks which had been beaten off fairly easily. On this occasion, despite his usual reticence to congest his forward positions with troops, Leane asked for permission to use two companies forward on the railway embankment, and another forward in a series of posts on the extreme left of the battalion sector. These posts were on either side of a gully just south of the Albert–Amiens road. He held his fourth company in a trench called Pioneer Trench, that had been dug on the high ground overlooking the embankment. He was also given a company of the 46th Battalion which he held in reserve near his headquarters. On 4 April, the commander of the 4th Division, Major General Ewen Sinclair-Maclagan decided the main line of defence would be the railway embankment, rather than the high ground behind it. While this did not change the dispositions of the 48th Battalion, it caused Gellibrand to issue an order that the embankment must be held at all costs, which had significant consequences for the coming battle. On the same day, word was received that a German attack was to be expected the next morning.

Leane himself, observing German trench-mortar fire, and suspecting that they were registering targets for a bombardment, ensured his battalion was ready for the impending battle, and sent out night patrols that detected large concentrations of German troops on a road only 140 metres (150 yd) beyond the embankment. Gellibrand ordered Lewis gun teams to be sent out to open fire on the assembling Germans, and called down artillery on the S.O.S. lines forward of the embankment. He also brought the 45th Battalion up to dig in on the high ground near Leane's headquarters. At 07:00, a heavy German bombardment came down, at first on rear areas of the 4th Division and its flanking formations, extending to the front line and supports about 08:00. Leane later observed that the barrage was "the heaviest since Pozières". No attack immediately materialised on the 48th Battalion's front, although large parties of Germans began advancing after an hour of the barrage descending on the frontline. In stiff fighting, the Germans were repulsed on the 48th Battalion's front. Although Leane had twice been ordered to disband the battalion scout platoon under a new standard battalion structure brought into force in 1917, he had only recently done so, and only in a formal sense. Instead, whenever the battalion went into action, a similar number of designated scouts immediately reported to him, and he posted them at various locations to keep him informed of events.

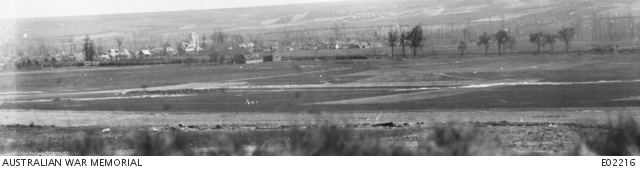
The Dernancourt battlefield, looking towards the village beyond the railway embankment from the final Australian trench line

About 10:30, some of Leane's scouts reported that the 13th Brigade, on the right of the 12th Brigade and opposite Dernancourt, was falling back. Around the same time, his right forward company on the embankment sent back a message indicating that the Germans had penetrated on the right of the brigade in the area of the 47th Battalion, and that it was taking over part of the left of the 47th Battalion line to assist. In response to a probe by the Germans against his northernmost company in the series of posts alongside the Albert–Amiens road, Leane immediately sent part of his reserve company from Pioneer Trench to reinforce it. Sensing the danger in the 13th Brigade area, Leane ordered Major Arthur Samuel Allen, commanding the nearby 45th Battalion, to move his battalion forward to vacant trenches overlooking that sector. As Allen was implementing these orders, he received conflicting orders from Gellibrand to send two companies forward to Pioneer Trench. Allen saw the wisdom of Leane's orders, and tried to convince the brigade major that Leane's preferred course of action was best. Nevertheless, Allen was directed to carry out Gellibrand's orders. Later events proved that, being the most experienced commander on the ground, Leane actually had the most accurate conception of the real danger to the 12th Brigade's position.

At 12:15, with the 47th Battalion having given way to the German onslaught and withdrawing past them up towards the high ground, the two forward companies of the 48th on the embankment began to withdraw, leaving the northernmost company in its posts around the gully near the Albert–Amiens road. Soon after, the northern company was forced to withdraw its posts on the southern side of the gully. When he heard of the withdrawal, Leane sent forward his second-in-command to establish the line that the battalion would now attempt to hold. By 13:30, the 48th was still holding its left flanking posts near the Albert–Amiens road, but the rest of the battalion had withdrawn to Pioneer Trench on the high ground. The left flank posts were not withdrawn until about 15:30. At this point, a counterattack was ordered, involving the 49th Battalion of the 13th Brigade, which had been in reserve, with all but the far left flank of the 12th Brigade conforming with its advance. Sinclair-Maclagan wanted to use four available tanks to support the attack, but this was refused by the brigade commanders. Deayton surmises that this rejection of the tanks was at the urging of Leane, who had taken such a negative view of them at Bullecourt. Sinclair-Maclagan then argued that the objective of both brigades must be to retake the railway line, but this was opposed by Gellibrand, supported by Leane, whose opinion he still valued highly. They argued that the 12th Brigade should only aim to retake the former support line partway down the hill. Sinclair-Maclagan's view prevailed, possibly as he was acting in accordance with direction from higher headquarters. Despite this, Leane, as the commander of the forward troops of the 12th Brigade, once again displayed his strong independent streak, disobeying those orders and directing the troops' main effort towards recapturing the support trenches.

The resulting counterattack was described by Bean as "one of the finest ever carried out by Australian troops". The 49th Battalion, flanked on its left by a line consisting of two companies of the 45th, the remnants of the 47th, and finally the re-organised 48th, surged forward at 17:15 into very heavy small arms fire, but by nightfall had reached positions not far short of the old support line. The 49th had fought its way to a position almost identical to that which Leane had wanted the 45th to deploy earlier in the day, when his orders had conflicted with those of Gellibrand. The line established overnight was the only one that had really ever been defensible. The forward troops of the 12th Brigade were relieved overnight by the 46th Battalion, and on 7 April the whole brigade was relieved by the 6th Brigade of the 2nd Division. During the latter fighting for Dernancourt, the 48th Battalion had lost another 4 officers and 77 men.

===== Monument Wood =====
After Dernancourt, the 48th Battalion marched to the rear and began establishing a reserve line at Beaucourt. On 18 April, Gellibrand was evacuated sick and Leane was appointed to act as brigade commander in his place. The following day he was temporarily promoted to the rank of colonel. During Gellibrand's absence, on 27–28 April, the 12th Brigade was deployed to the line at Villers-Bretonneux, which had just been recaptured from the Germans. In order to push the frontline further east of the town, it was necessary to capture strongly-held German positions in Monument Wood, so-named as it was adjacent to a memorial to the Franco-Prussian War. This task was given to the 12th Brigade, and Leane, knowing that the fighting would be difficult, applied his usual practice of giving the most challenging missions to his own, the 48th Battalion. After the intense fighting at Dernancourt, the 48th had been reinforced with a significant number of unseasoned new recruits. The attack was planned for 02:00 on 3 May, and in order to achieve surprise, there was to be only intermittent shelling of the wood during the day, and just a two-minute barrage with all available guns at the time of the attack. In the event, Leane's first battle as brigade commander went badly, with the artillery barrage being very weak and failing to cut the wire in front of the wood, and the supporting tanks failing to have any impact. One party managed to get through the wire and capture 21 Germans in the farm buildings in the centre of the wood, but a German counterattack forced the Australians back to their start line, with a loss of 12 officers and 143 other ranks, against German casualties of 10 officers and 136 men.

==== Brigade command ====
Leane returned to the 48th on 22 May and reverted in rank, but a little over a week later he was substantively promoted to colonel and temporarily promoted to brigadier general to command the 12th Brigade, as Gellibrand had been promoted to major general and appointed to command the 3rd Division. For his "considerable skill and ability" while acting brigade commander, Leane was recommended for the award of the French Croix de Guerre, and was mentioned in despatches for the sixth time. Immediately before his assumption of command, the limited number of reinforcements available, combined with losses suffered by the 12th Brigade at Dernancourt and Monument Wood necessitated the disbandment of one of the battalions of the brigade, and the 47th Battalion was chosen. Between 25 and 27 May its manpower was divided equally between the other battalions of the brigade.

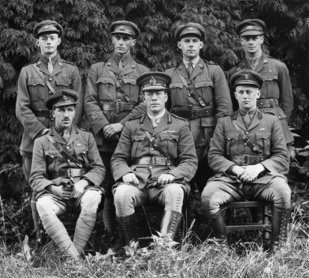
Leane (seated centre) with his brigade headquarters staff in October 1918

Leane then led his brigade during the highly successful Battle of Amiens on 8 August, during which it spearheaded the 4th Division as it leapfrogged through the 3rd Division to capture the second and third objectives, suffering casualties of nine officers and 212 other ranks. The second objective was captured by the 45th and 46th Battalions, with the 48th Battalion capturing the third objective, along with 200 prisoners and 12 machine guns. The Battle of Amiens was later described by the German General Erich Ludendorff as "the black day of the German Army".

After a rest in reserve positions, the 12th Brigade was then in the forefront of the attack on the Hindenburg Outpost Line on 18 September, with the 48th Battalion leading the assault in the first phase, followed by the 45th which captured the second objective. Despite opinions to the contrary, Leane realised that the third "exploitation" phase of the attack would not be achieved by patrols, and would require the commitment of an entire battalion, and he allocated the 46th to the task. As the Australians were determined to push forward to the third objective despite a longer delay on the second objective by the British on the right flank of the 12th Brigade, Leane gave the commanding officer of the 46th Battalion very specific instructions regarding his assault, including to attack in great depth and protect his right flank. About 15:00, the attack of the 46th was held up by German resistance, so once he received this report, Leane went forward and urged its commanding officer to renew the attack as soon as artillery support could be arranged. The commanding officer argued against this approach, saying that his men were exhausted and needed rest and food. Leane accepted this, and it was decided that the attack would be renewed at 23:00. Leane, concerned about his exposed right flank caused by the failure of the British to go forward, ordered two companies of the 48th Battalion to prepare to attack across the divisional boundary and capture a hill in the forward area of the British 1st Division, but had to cancel the order when the British divisional commander objected. Instead, he had the two companies advance to a position protecting that flank but within his brigade boundary.

That night, the 46th's attack was a great success, netting about 550 prisoners. Leane placed the two companies of the 48th under the command of the 46th to assist in consolidation of the position. The attack of the 46th, and on its left flank, the 14th Battalion, was an "extraordinarily daring attack", which, according to Bean, achieved results rarely achieved on the Western Front, and it was only on the Australian Corps front that the third objective of the attack was achieved. The British on the right flank repeatedly reported that they had also captured the third objective, but Leane, sending a patrol to make contact, quickly ascertained this report was incorrect. It was later found that what had been referred to as the Hindenburg Outpost Line was in fact being held as the main German position. The 12th Brigade had suffered casualties amounting to 19 officers and 282 men in achieving this success. The 4th Division was then relieved and went to the rear to rest. The brigade did not return to combat before the Armistice of 11 November 1918.

After the war had ended, Leane acted as the commander of the 4th Division for a month, took some leave, was mentioned in despatches for the seventh time, and was also awarded the French Croix de Guerre. In April, he ceased to command the 12th Brigade, as it had been amalgamated with another brigade as men were repatriated to Australia. Leane then travelled to the United Kingdom, where he was appointed as General Officer Commanding No. 4 Group Hurdcott on the Salisbury Plain, which had an important role in repatriation. In June, he was made a Companion of the Order of the Bath. The recommendation for the award read:

This officer has commanded the 12th Australian Infantry Brigade during the operations 1 June to 17 September 1918 and the period 18 September to 11 November 1918. In the latter period his brigade made a brilliant advance and captured the Hindenburg Outpost Line north of St. Quentin with over 1,200 prisoners and many guns, and though enfiladed from the south, held this most important position in spite of very considerable hostile opposition and counter-measures. This officer is a most gallant and able leader and has commanded his brigade with great skill, gallantry and resource during the whole of the operations since 4 July 1918.

In July, he was mentioned in despatches for the eighth and final time. In September he relinquished his duties at Hurdcott and embarked to return to Australia. Leane was variously described by Bean in his Official History of Australia in the War of 1914–1918 as, "the head of the most famous family of soldiers in Australian history", "the fighting general par excellence", "the foremost fighting leader in the AIF", "a particularly cool and forcible – and serious commander", and a "great leader". He had a reputation as "a considerate leader, with great strength of character and a high sense of duty. In action he was... unflappable and heedless of danger". Of Leane's four brothers who served in World War I, two were killed. Six of his nephews also served, two of whom were killed. The Leanes became one of the nation's most distinguished fighting families, and were known as the "Fighting Leanes of Prospect".

== Police commissioner ==
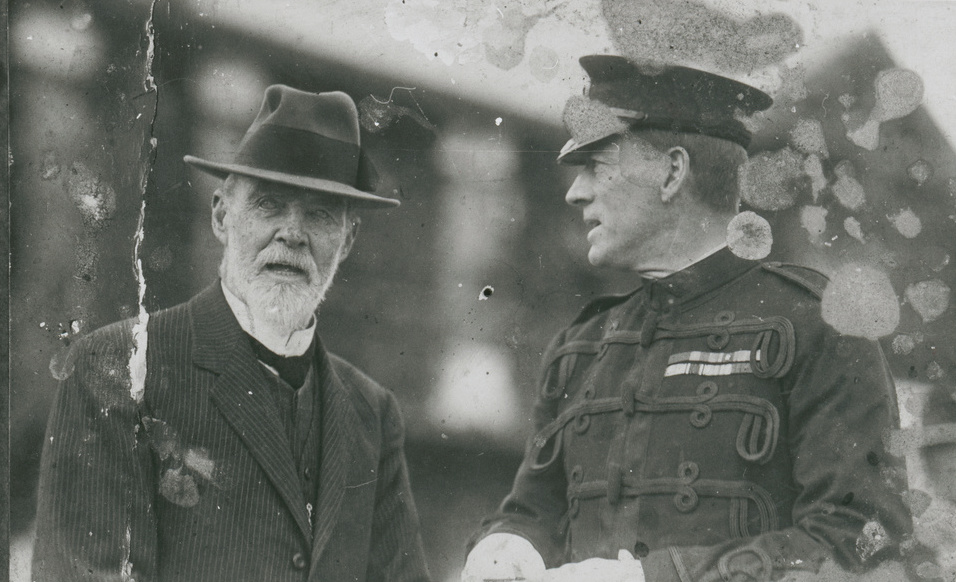
Retired Commissioner W. H. Raymond and Leane (right, in police uniform) in the early 1920s

Leane disembarked in Adelaide on 18 October 1919, and his appointment in the AIF was terminated, in accordance with normal repatriation procedures, on 3 January 1920. In addition to the decorations he had received during the war, he was also issued with the 1914–15 Star, British War Medal and Victory Medal. While deployed overseas, he had been promoted to the brevet rank of lieutenant colonel in the peacetime Citizen Forces. On 20 January 1920, he was promoted to the substantive rank of colonel, "supernumerary to the establishment of Colonels," with the honorary rank of brigadier-general. On 13 May 1920, it was announced that Leane would be the next Commissioner of the South Australia Police from 1 July, replacing Thomas Edwards. Leane's appointment was something of a surprise to senior police officers, who, based on long-standing arrangements, expected that the commissioner would be appointed from within the force. At the time, Leane was described as a "splendid fellow" by soldiers who had served under his command, and it was observed that "tact and firm decision" were outstanding features of his character. When the Police Association, which represented the rank-and-file of the force, met on 29 June, Leane's appointment was freely discussed, and it was resolved that, despite the fact that they, as a body, were opposed to the appointment of an outsider as Commissioner, they would be loyal to him. The meeting also decided to ask Leane to meet with representatives of each branch of the service as soon as possible, to discuss various grievances and suggest reforms.

In July 1920, Leane was appointed to command the part-time 19th Infantry Brigade, which encompassed the metropolitan area of Adelaide and the south-east districts of South Australia, and was part of the peacetime military structure. In the same year, he was appointed as an aide-de-camp to the Governor-General. In May of the following year, as part of a re-organisation of the Citizen Forces, he was appointed to command the 3rd Infantry Brigade. In response to Leane's annual report on the police force in December 1922, The Register newspaper observed that Leane had "dispelled, for the most part, any feeling of regret at his appointment which existed among members of the force", and that he had won their respect by his strict impartiality, consideration and sense of justice. It also stated that the conditions of police service had markedly improved in the two years since his appointment.

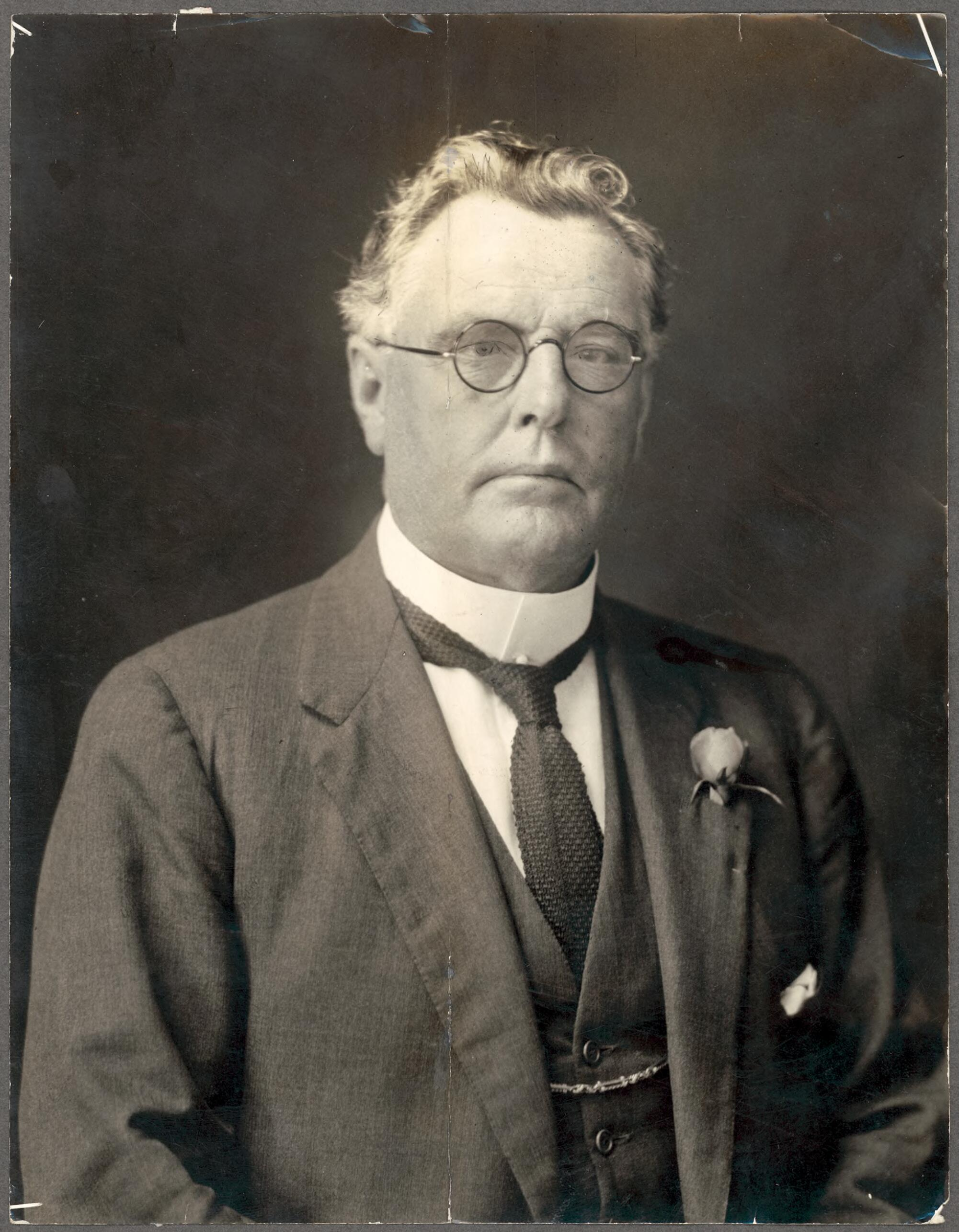
Leane brought a defamation case against Harry Kneebone (pictured) over an article in his newspaper

In June 1923, Leane brought a case of defamation against Harry Kneebone, the editor of the Australian Labor Party (ALP) newspaper, The Daily Herald. The case alleged that Kneebone had impugned Leane's reputation over the conduct of the 3rd Infantry Brigade annual camp at Wingfield in March that year, over which Leane had presided. The paper had described the camp as a "breeding ground for outlawry", had claimed that discipline was lacking, and that the food and accommodation was poor, among other things. Bill Denny, a lawyer and ALP Member of Parliament, represented Kneebone. It was determined that there was a prima facie case against the defendant, and the matter was scheduled for trial in the Supreme Court in October, but the jury was unable to come to a verdict and were dismissed. The case was abandoned in November.

By July 1923, The Advertiser newspaper was reporting that Leane's approach over his three years at the helm had made a significant difference in the administration of the South Australia Police, explaining that Leane had dispensed with seniority as the basis for promotion, by substituting merit and efficiency, as well as selecting candidates who displayed qualities of sympathy and tact in dealing with the public. In February 1925, Leane hosted a conference of commissioners of police from around Australia held in Adelaide. Leane actively supported commemorative activities such as Anzac Day and Remembrance Day, and attended unveilings of memorials. In April 1926, Leane relinquished command of the 3rd Infantry Brigade, and was placed on the unattached list. For his military service since 1905, he had also been awarded the Volunteer Officers' Decoration.

In 1926–1927, a Royal Commission into bribery of members of the police by bookmakers was conducted, finding that it was probable that two detectives and several plainclothes constables were guilty of taking bribes. After considering the report of the Royal Commission, Leane submitted his own report to the government, in which he criticised the vague nature of its findings, and while accepting that some police may have accepted bribes, he asserted that corruption was not widespread. One detective and three constables were offered the opportunity to resign and took it, and another plainclothes constable was returned to uniformed duty. During the course of the royal commission, several other plainclothes constables had resigned. Before the commission concluded, Leane recommended to the Chief Secretary, James Jelley, who was the minister responsible for the police, that the plainclothes branch of the police be abolished, with uniformed constables to be rotated through those duties as required. His recommendation was accepted. In January 1927, the design by Leane's brother-in-law, Louis Laybourne Smith, was selected for the National War Memorial in Adelaide. In early 1928, Leane became a foundation member and the inaugural president of the Legacy Club of Adelaide, established to assist the dependents of deceased ex-servicemen.

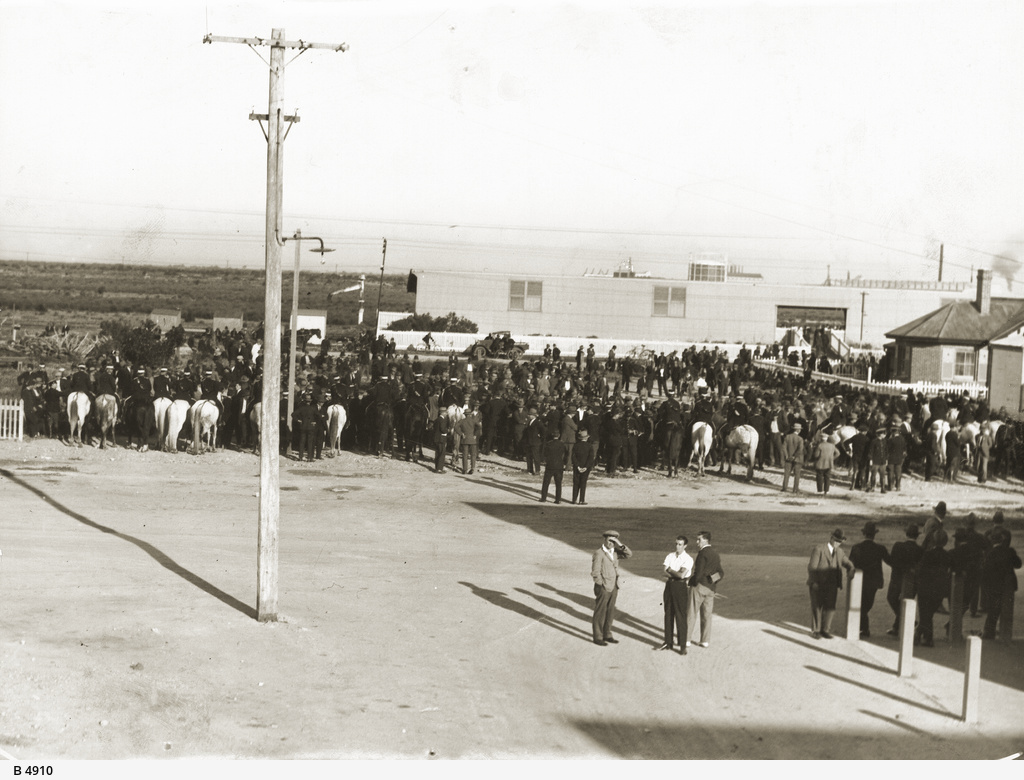
Strikers and police at Outer Harbor on 27 September 1928

In September 1928, Leane provided police protection to non-union strikebreakers brought in to work on the Port Adelaide wharves to circumvent a dispute over the industrial award that covered the waterfront. Leane went to the extent of personally supervising police operations, despite a lack of unrest at the beginning of the dispute. There were suggestions that communists were interfering in internal union deliberations to resolve the matter. A week later, the continued employment of non-union labour resulted in significant violence on the waterfront. On the morning of 27 September, a crowd of between 4,000 and 5,000 unionists and others overran the Port Adelaide wharves, boarding ships and injuring and intimidating strikebreakers. That afternoon, a crowd of 2,000 marched the 9.7 kilometres (6 mi) from Port Adelaide to Outer Harbor to confront the strikebreakers working there. Leane, accompanied by just one inspector, met the leaders and attempted to dissuade them from entering the wharf area. Instead, the crowd surged forward towards the docks. But Leane, his inspectors and about 150 mounted and foot police immediately set into motion plans to first break up the mass of the crowd among the buildings, then cordon off a significant portion of it in an open allotment. For some time they remained at a stalemate, but the crowd eventually dispersed having been unable to approach any of the strikebreakers or the vessels they were working on. The unionists had attacked a number of police and police horses, there had been a considerable amount of stone throwing by the crowd, and the police had used their batons freely at times. The events of the day were described in The Register as "probably without parallel in the history of the state".

Over the following weekend, some 1,000 volunteers were sworn in as part of the Citizens' Defence Brigade, a force of special constables raised at Leane's request to augment the police in dealing with the waterfront dispute. The brigade was based at Fort Largs and was equipped with service rifles and bayonets. The men were quickly posted at the wharves to maintain law and order. During the dispute, Leane slept in an office at the port so that he was on hand to deal with any emergencies. Leane's decision to arm the mostly inexperienced volunteers with bayonets was later criticised in Parliament. The dispute continued on, with major disturbances at Port Adelaide on 14 January 1929 which resulted in many injuries, and another on 17 January. A significant police presence was required at the wharves into 1930 to deal with disturbances and assaults on non-union workers, and Leane personally supervised police operations there on several occasions.

In November 1928, two of Leane's sons, Lionel and Geoffrey, had joined the mounted police. In 1931, The Mail newspaper published a glowing article on Leane's eleven years as commissioner, praising the discipline and efficiency he had brought to the force, and describing him as a "true fighter" and "humane leader", who "never asks a man to do what he would not do himself". In the following year, Leane introduced 15–17 year old police cadets into the force, in a push to recruit more highly trained men. He specified that if all other things were equal, preference for the cadetships would be given to the sons of deceased returned servicemen. In 1934, Leane built on this scheme by introducing probationary police training for youths aged 17 to 20. Leane was also an advocate for the role of female police officers, and was the first to place a woman in control of the female members of the force. In 1934, he introduced police dogs into service, and in the following year he unveiled a memorial to police officers who had died on duty since 1862. Also in 1935, Leane proposed a nationwide scheme to analyse traffic accidents to determine the risk factors contributing to them, and tailor police traffic enforcement operations, and in the interim, implemented such a program in South Australia. In 1936, a biographical sketch of Leane mentioned that he was a justice of the peace, had been president of the Commonwealth Club in Adelaide, was the chairman of the South Australian branch of the Institute of Public Administration, and had been awarded the King George V Silver Jubilee Medal the previous year.

In 1937, Leane was made an Officer of the Order of Saint John, and also received the King George VI Coronation Medal. In the same year he introduced training in morse code for police officers, presaging the introduction of radio to the police force. In 1938, Leane was placed on the retired list of military officers, having reached 60 years of age. His service in the police was extended by an act of Parliament allowing him to serve until he was 65. Leane's continuing concern about traffic accidents and their consequences was highlighted by a map maintained in his office, on which all accidents were marked. In April 1939, with the danger of war in Europe, Leane became a member of the State Emergency Civil Defence Council, with responsibilities for internal security, protection of vulnerable points, control of the civil population, intelligence, detention of enemy civil aircraft, civil flying, and the air examination service.

In the same year, after the outbreak of World War II, Leane advocated for the introduction of radio communications into the police, stressing the need for quick response in cases of civil emergency. On 18 June 1940, Leane was appointed as the commander of the Returned and Services League-organised Volunteer Defence Corps (VDC) in South Australia, an organisation similar to the Home Guard in the United Kingdom. Within two weeks, more than 2,000 returned World War I servicemen had enlisted in the VDC. In response to the outbreak of war, by July 1940 Leane had authorised the swearing-in of 3,000 special constables to guard vulnerable points and industry against fifth column elements. On 19 October, Leane commanded a parade of more than 5,000 VDC members, including 2,000 who had travelled from country areas. By February 1941, the VDC had increased to a strength of 8,000 men. During World War II, South Australia was the only state to permit members of the police to enlist in the armed forces, but this was withdrawn after Japan entered the war, due to the need to maintain police numbers. In July 1943, Leane's appointment as VDC commander was extended for twelve months, despite the fact that he had reached the normal Army retirement age of 65. On 30 June 1944, Leane retired as police commissioner, and was replaced by William Francis Johns, a serving superintendent.

== Retirement ==
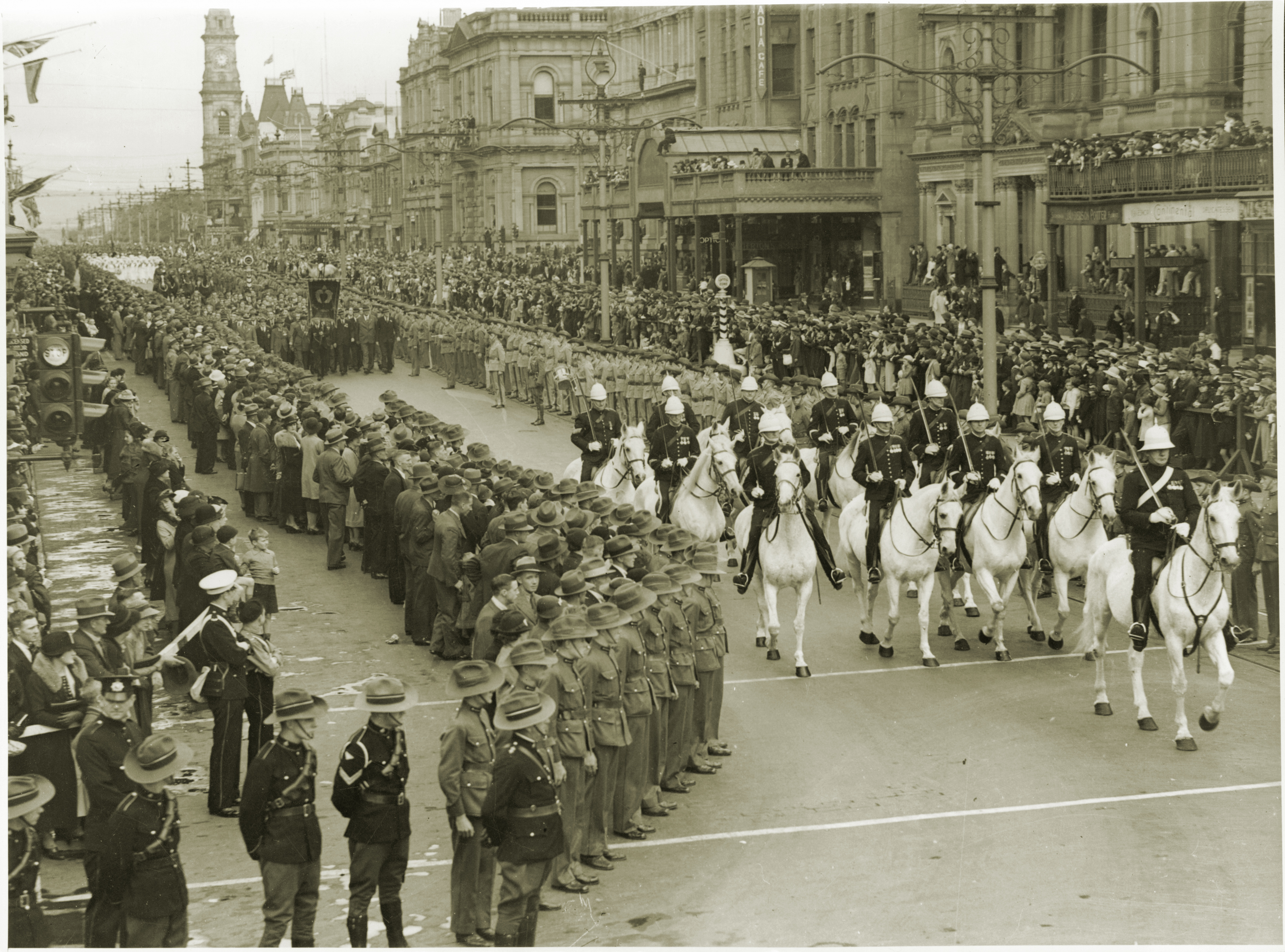
Leane led the Adelaide Anzac Day March for many years

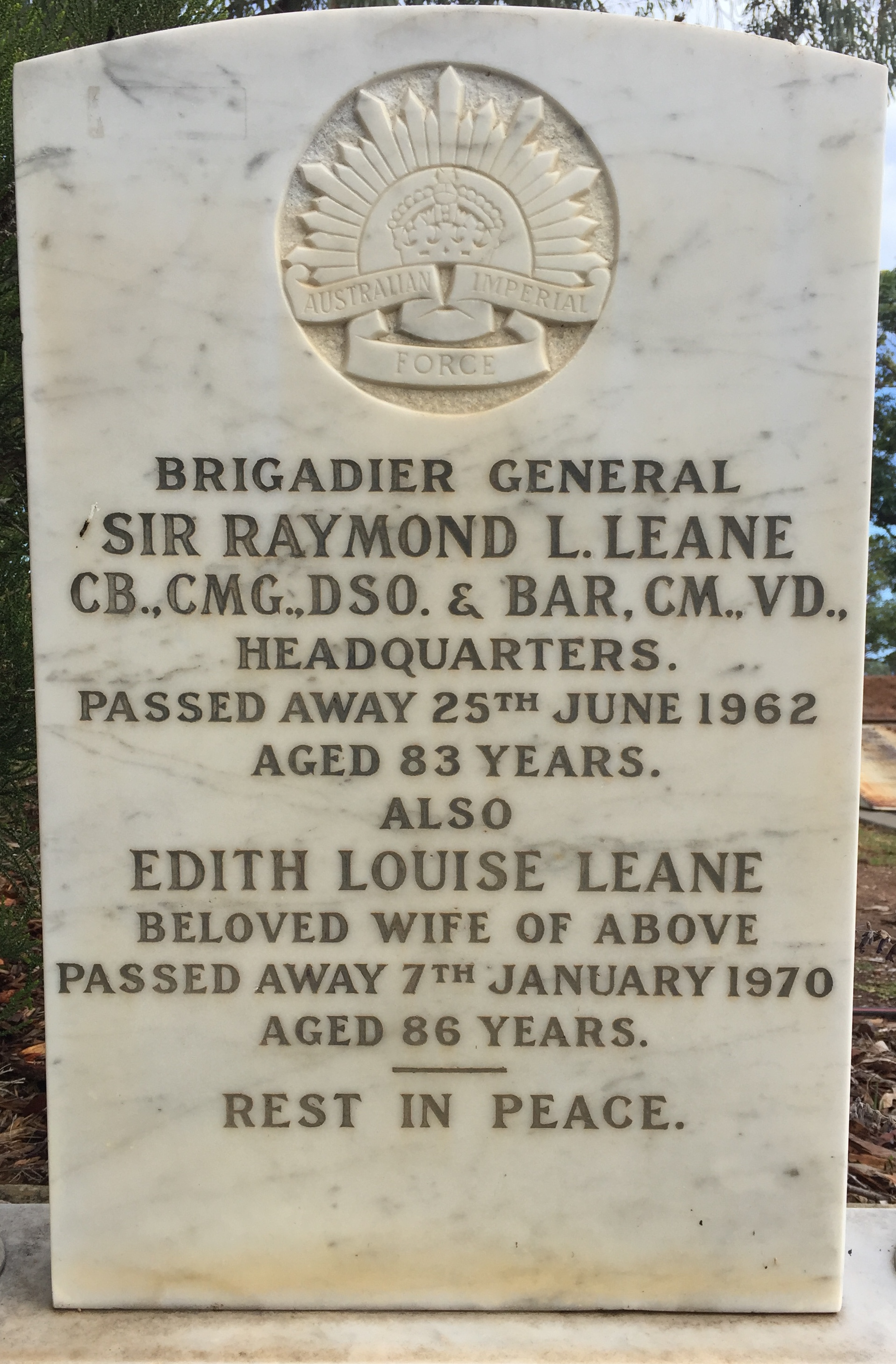
Leane's gravestone in Centennial Park cemetery

After Leane's retirement as police commissioner, he briefly continued his work with the VDC, resigning on 30 July 1944. He was knighted in the 1945 King's birthday honours for his services as police commissioner over a 24-year period. For his service with the VDC during World War II he was issued with the War Medal 1939–1945 and Australia Service Medal 1939–1945. In 1946, he became the inaugural president of the Plympton branch of the conservative Liberal and Country League, the forerunner of the state Liberal Party. He continued to lead the Adelaide Anzac Day March each year, and on 7 September 1946 was invested with his knighthood by the Governor-General of Australia, Prince Henry, Duke of Gloucester.

His police cadet system was allowed to lapse after his retirement, but it was re-introduced by John McKinna, another former soldier, who became commissioner in 1957. He remained a strong advocate of part-time soldiering, as well as a system of universal military training. Leane lived in Adelaide until his death at the Repatriation General Hospital, Daw Park, on 25 June 1962, with him and his wife celebrating their diamond wedding anniversary two weeks before his death. He was buried in Centennial Park Cemetery, and was survived by his wife, Edith, and six children: five sons and a daughter. His son Geoffrey was originally a mounted policeman then a detective, was a lieutenant colonel and twice mentioned in despatches during World War II, later became a police inspector, and was deputy commissioner from 1959 to 1972. His namesake son, known as Lionel, became a detective sergeant. Another son, Benjamin, was a warrant officer during World War II, and survived being a prisoner-of-war of the Japanese.

On receiving the news of his death, McKinna said that Leane was "a grand man and an excellent soldier", who "was really the father of the present-day police force, as during his term as police commissioner he reorganised the whole force". He also said that, "The force was now receiving the benefits of his reorganisation and the many new systems and improvements he introduced". He observed that Leane "was always a strict disciplinarian but was scrupulously fair in all his dealings". The Premier of South Australia, Sir Thomas Playford, said that Leane "had been one of the great generals of World War I, and had also served with conspicuous ability as police commissioner for many years".

== See also ==
- List of Australian generals and brigadiers
