= 14th Brigade (Australia) =

Formation of the Australian Army

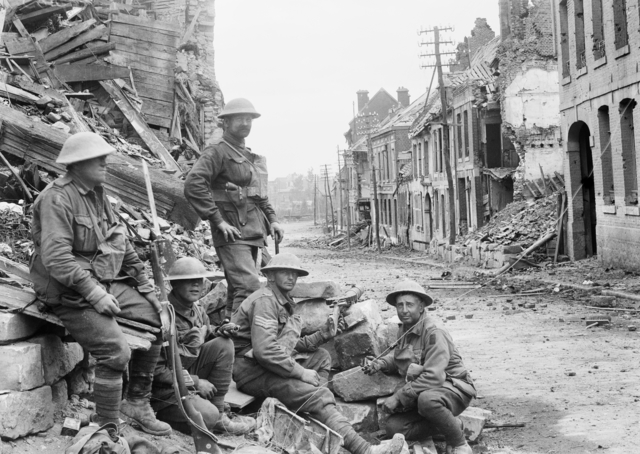
- Soldiers of the 54th Battalion at Peronne, September 1918
- Active: 1912–1960
- Country: Australia
- Branch: Australian Army
- Type: Infantry
- Size: ~3,500 – 4,000 men
- Engagements: World War I: Western Front; World War II: New Guinea campaign

Insignia
- Unit colour patch

The 14th Brigade was an infantry brigade of the Australian Army. Originally raised in 1912 as a Militia formation, it was later re-raised in 1916 as part of the First Australian Imperial Force for service during World War I, the brigade was assigned to the 5th Division and served on the Western Front between 1916 and 1918 before being disbanded. It was later re-raised as part of the Australia's part-time military forces during the inter-war years. During World War II, the brigade was a Militia formation and it took part briefly in the New Guinea campaign with elements of the brigade undertaking defensive duties around Port Moresby before taking part in the fighting along the Kokoda Track and around the Japanese beachheads at Buna–Gona. The brigade was disbanded in mid-1943 as part of a rationalisation of Australian military forces as a result of manpower shortages.

== History ==
The 14th Brigade traces its origins to 1912, when it was formed as a Militia brigade as part of the introduction of the compulsory training scheme, assigned to the 3rd Military District. At this time, the brigade's constituent units were located in Victoria with detachments around Kew, Glenferrie, Northcote, Fitzroy, Abbotsford, and Richmond.

=== World War I ===
During World War I, the brigade was re-raised in mid-1916 in Egypt as part of the expansion of the Australian Imperial Force (AIF) after the Gallipoli Campaign, the 14th Brigade was formed from a cadre of experienced personnel drawn from the 1st Brigade who had fought at Gallipoli, and reinforced by new recruits from Australia. With a strength of around 3,500 to 4,000 men who were organised into four infantry battalions – the 53rd, 54th, 55th and 56th Battalions – the brigade was assigned to the 5th Division. The brigade also later raised the 14th Australian Machine Gun Company and the 14th Australian Trench Mortar Battery, although the machine-gunners were later removed from the brigade and formed into the Australian 5th Machine Gun Battalion in February 1918.

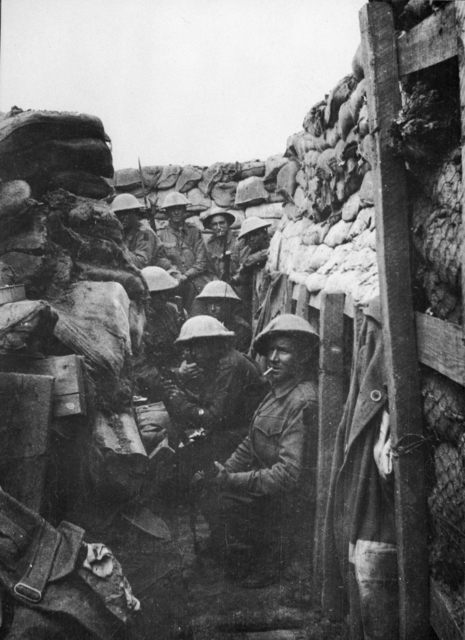
Members of the 53rd Battalion at Fromelles; three of the men survived the battle, all wounded.

In mid-1916, the AIF's infantry divisions were transferred to France, to join the fighting along the Western Front. As a result, after a short period of training in the desert, the 14th Brigade was transferred to Europe along with the rest of the 5th Division, which had the distinction of being the first Australian division committed to the fighting on the Western Front when it took part in the Battle of Fromelles in July. Conceived as a diversion to the Somme, the battle proved disastrous for the Australians and, due to the heavy casualties the division suffered, it was later described as "the worst 24 hours in Australia's entire history".

For the next two years, the brigade took part in several major operations. In early 1917, the Germans shortened their lines and withdrew to the prepared positions of the Hindenburg Line. After this, the brigade took part in the Battle of Bullecourt and the Third Battle of Ypres. Early the following year, the collapse of the Russian Empire enabled the Germans to transfer a large number of troops from the Eastern Front to the west, and they subsequently launched the Spring Offensive. As the offensive drove the Allies back, the brigade was transferred south from Belgium to the Somme, with its infantry battalions manning positions around Villers-Bretonneux, where they were involved in heavy fighting during the Second Battle of Villers-Bretonneux securing flanking positions to the north of the town, resisting heavy attack.

After the German offensive was halted, in the lull that followed the brigade took part in the Battle of Hamel in July and then later, after the Allies launched their Hundred Days Offensive in August 1918, they fought around Amiens, and the St Quentin Canal as the Hindenburg Line was broken. The fighting around the St Quentin Canal was the brigade's final involvement in the war, as the Australian Corps was withdrawn for rest and reorganisation in early October 1918, and was still out of the line when the armistice was signed in November. For most of its duration on the Western Front, the brigade was commanded by Brigadier General Clarence John Hobkirk, a British officer originally from the Essex Regiment. During the war, four 14th Brigade soldiers received the Victoria Cross for their actions: William Currey, John Ryan, Alexander Buckley and Arthur Hall.

=== Inter-war years ===
After the cessation of hostilities, the brigade was disbanded in 1919 as part of the demobilisation of the AIF. It was re-raised again in 1921 within the 2nd Military District as Australia's part-time military, the Citizens Force was reorganised to perpetuate the designations of the AIF units. At this time, the 14th Brigade consisted of four battalions – the 3rd, 53rd, 55th, and 56th – and was headquartered at Marrickville, New South Wales. From the outset of their re-formation, the Citizens Forces units were staffed through a mixture of voluntary and compulsory service, but as throughout the 1920s, as a result of economic pressures, the scope of the compulsory service scheme was reduced, and finally in late 1929, the scheme was suspended completely by the Scullin Labor government, and replaced by an all-volunteer "Militia" scheme.

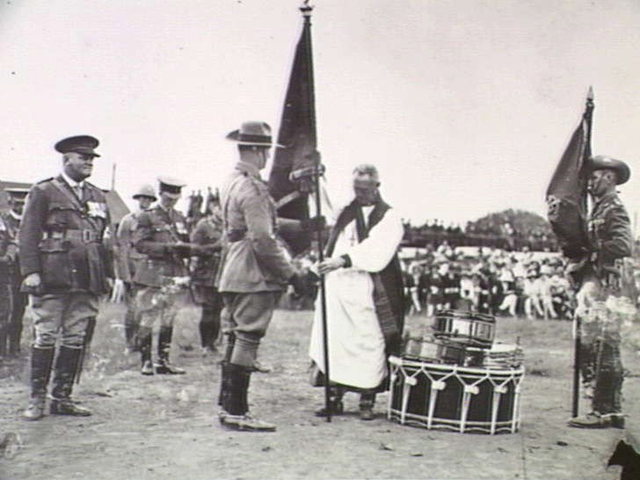
The 55th Battalion receives its Colours in a ceremony at Liverpool, New South Wales, in 1927.

Throughout the 1930s, the economic impact of the Great Depression resulted in a period of austerity for Australia's military. The scarcity of employment meant that there were only limited numbers of volunteers as men who had jobs could not afford to risk them by taking time off for military training. In addition, equipment was scarce or obsolete and there were only limited training opportunities available for those that could parade. The reduced manning resulted in several battalions being amalgamated or disbanded. Of the 14th Brigade's units, this affected the 3rd Battalion, which was initially amalgamated with the 4th Battalion in 1930 and then later the 53rd, although these were later delinked in the late 1930s as the military was expanded due to concerns about war in Europe; the 53rd and 55th Battalions were also linked for a period during the 1930s. From 1933, Colonel Arthur Allan commanded the brigade, remaining in command until after the outbreak of World War II.

=== World War II and post war ===
In September 1939, at the outbreak of World War II, the brigade was mobilised for war service and Brigadier Walter Smith was appointed commander. With a strength of around 3,500 men, it consisted of the 3rd, 34th and 55th/53rd Battalions and was assigned to the 2nd Division. In early war plans, the brigade was assigned a defensive role around Sydney and Port Kembla. As a result of the provisions of the Defence Act, which initially precluded units of the Militia from being deployed outside Australian territory, throughout the early years of the war the brigade was used as a garrison force, defending mainland Australia and providing training to recruits called up under the provisions of the compulsory training scheme, which was reinstated in January 1940. Periods of continuous training were undertaken around Bathurst, New South Wales, initially before the brigade was moved to Newcastle, New South Wales, to occupy a position in reserve, to reinforce troops in the forward areas in the event of an invasion. The defences around Port Kembla were taken over by the 28th Brigade at this time.

The brigade moved to Greta in October 1941 and was mobilised their for full time service following Japan's entry into the war. At this time, the 14th Brigade relieved the 1st Brigade in Newcastle, to allow that formation to undertake further collective training. The invasion never came and in May 1942, the brigade – consisting of the 3rd and 36th Battalions and the recently delinked 55th – was sent to Port Moresby to bolster the garrison there. At the time, the brigade was assessed as being only partially trained. The 3rd Battalion undertook defensive duties around Port Moresby initially, but was later committed to the fighting along the Kokoda Track in September and October 1942 undertaking patrols and taking part in several actions including the Battle of Ioribaiwa, the Second Battle of Eora Creek – Templeton's Crossing and the Battle of Oivi–Gorari. Later, the battalion was committed to the assault on the Japanese beachheads around Buna–Gona.

The 55th Battalion subsequently served in New Guinea from May to October 1942, undertaking garrison duties around Port Moresby and Milne Bay before carrying out patrols along the Goldie River Valley throughout September, when the 14th Brigade was tasked with keeping lines of communication secure. In October 1942, they were amalgamated once again with the 53rd and together they were assigned to the 30th Brigade. In early 1943, this battalion was reassigned to the 14th Brigade before returning to Australia; however, in April 1943 they were assigned to the 11th Brigade with whom they remained for the rest of the war. The 36th Battalion, which had replaced the 34th, was assigned to the brigade between 8 April 1941 and 14 December 1942 and then again between 3 January 1943 and 24 April 1943, and undertook patrolling operations before later being reassigned to the 30th Brigade, with whom they took part in the fighting around Sanananda, before rejoining the 14th Brigade when it was transferred north to Gona where they briefly took part in the fighting there throughout January 1943.

Other units that were assigned to the brigade around this time were the 49th Battalion (11–21 August 1942), and the 39th Battalion (18–27 September 1942). Its divisional assignments were changed a number of times after the outbreak of the war as it was moved from the 2nd Division to New Guinea Force in May 1942, the 7th Division in September 1942, the 11th Division in February 1943 and then finally to the 4th Division in March 1943. By April 1943, the 14th Brigade had returned to Australia, and became part of Yorkforce around Townsville. On 11 September 1943 it was disbanded, as manpower shortages required the Australian Army to merge or disband a number of Militia formations to reallocate resources elsewhere. Upon disbandment, the brigade consisted of two battalions, the 55th/53rd and the 36th. The brigade's final commander was Brigadier Ian Fullarton, who took over from Smith on 31 March 1943. The brigade's headquarters was retained, however, and used to raise the headquarters for Goodenough Force at Milne Bay, in New Guinea, underneath the 5th Infantry Division. They were later redesignated as headquarters Milne Bay Fortress before becoming Milne Bay Base Sub Area in October 1943 and then Area Command, Milne Bay in October 1944, retaining this designation as part of the First Army until the end of the war.

In the post war period, the 14th Brigade was briefly re-raised as a part-time formation following the implementation of a conscription scheme that required those called up to serve within the Citizens Military Force. Between 1951 and 1960 it formed part of the 2nd Division, under Eastern Command. The brigade was disbanded when the scheme ended.
