= Walter Edmond Smith =

Australian Army officer and industrialist

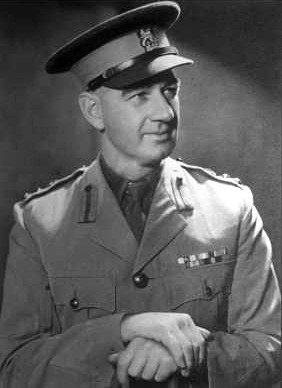
- Brigadier Walter Edmond Smith
- Born: 30 March 1895; Sydney, New South Wales
- Died: 1976; Coffs Harbour, New South Wales
- Military career
- Allegiance: Australia
- Branch: Australian Army
- Service years: 1914–1944
- Rank: Brigadier
- Nickname: Iron Duke
- Service number: NX127347
- Commands: 14th Brigade (1939–42); 55th Battalion (1930–35); 3rd Battalion (1925–30)
- Conflicts: First World War; Asian and Pacific theatre; Battle of Fromelles; Battle of Polygon Wood; Battle of Mont Saint-Quentin; Second World War; New Guinea Campaign
- Awards: Military Cross & Bar; Efficiency Decoration
- Other work: Founder, WE Smith Engineering Pty Ltd

Walter Edmond (Edmund) Smith, MC & Bar, ED (30 March 1895 – 1976) was an Australian Army officer and industrialist who fought in both World Wars. In the First World War, he served in the Australian Naval and Military Expeditionary Force north-east of Australia in the New Guinea area then in the Australian Imperial Force on the Western Front from 1916 to 1918. In the Second World War, as a brigadier, he commanded the first force deployed in the New Guinea Campaign, Australia's most important military campaign. (Note: "The Pacific War provided the most serious test ever faced by the Australian Army, and by the Australian people", see Grey 2001, p. 133.) During this campaign, he opposed elements of Australian military policy, and his name was omitted from the official Australian history of the New Guinea Campaign. In civilian life he founded Australian engineering firm WE Smith Marine and General Engineer in 1922 (later WE Smith Engineering Pty Ltd) which he managed continuously – except for the period during the Second World War that he undertook full-time military service – until his retirement in the 1970s.

== Early life and career ==
Walter Smith was born in Sydney on 30 March 1895. On finishing secondary school, he was apprenticed to marine and general engineering firm, Nicol Brothers, Darling Harbour, Sydney.

== First World War ==
Shortly after the outbreak of First World War, Smith enlisted in the Australian Naval and Military Expeditionary Force (AN&MEF). In September 1914, the AN&MEF was dispatched to occupy the German Protectorate of New Guinea, which was administered from Rabaul on the island of New Britain north-east of New Guinea. The operation was Australia's first military engagement of the war and in October, after a brief period of fighting, the Australians secured their objectives. The AN&MEF's six-month tour of duty ended in February 1915 and Smith subsequently enlisted in the Australian Imperial Force (AIF). He was too late to serve at Gallipoli, but went on to serve on the Western Front from 1916 to 1918 as part of the 14th Infantry Brigade, (Note: Nominal Roll, WWI – Walter Edmond Smith, Embarkation Roll, WWI – Walter Edmond Smith) seeing action in a number of battles including Fromelles in 1916, Polygon Wood in 1917, and Mont St Quentin and Péronne in 1918. He was awarded the Military Cross twice, and was recommended for the Distinguished Service Order. (Note: Documents at Honours and Awards, Australian War Memorial indexed variously under Walter Edmund/Edmond/Edward Smith: Account of Service 1917, Polygon Wood MC, Péronne MC., Recommendation Belgian Croix de Guerre) He was also mentioned in General Sir John Monash's, The Australian Victories in France in 1918, and in the official Australian history of the First World War in Europe. During his time on the Western Front, Smith was hospitalised several times, being wounded by machine-gun fire, shrapnel, and poison gas, and also suffering from trench foot, a form of frostbite.

== Inter-war years ==
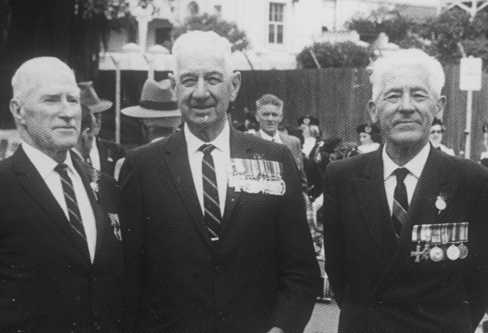
Walter Smith (center), John Ridley (right)

After the war, Smith returned to Sydney where he married Gladys Emily Bullot. In 1922, he founded a company called WE Smith Marine and General Engineer, based in Argyle Street, in The Rocks. Walter and Gladys had three children: Winifred (Win), Elizabeth (Beth) and John.

Smith was a lifelong friend of John Ridley, who had served as a Lewis gunner with Smith during the war. Ridley, who had been shot through the neck during the Battle of Fromelles, became a street preacher and was instrumental in converting Sydney identity, Arthur Stace, to Christianity.

Between the wars, Smith maintained his links with the military, serving in the part-time forces, the Australian Citizen Military Forces (CMF), based at Victoria Barracks, Sydney.

== Second World War ==
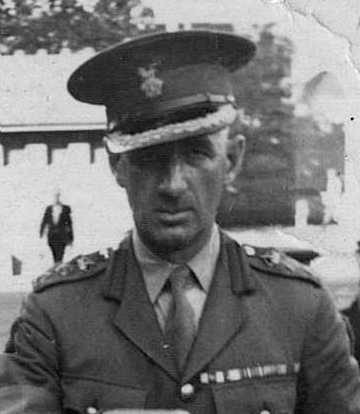
1939. Brig. WE Smith, near Central Railway Station, Sydney

On 23 October 1939, soon after the outbreak of the Second World War, Smith was promoted to the rank of brigadier and appointed commander of the Australian 14th Infantry Brigade, a militia unit with members drawn mainly from rural New South Wales and Canberra. Until April 1942, the brigade was tasked with coastal defence of Australia's main war production centres stretching from Port Kembla (steel production) about 110 kilometres south of Sydney to Newcastle (coal extraction) about 160 kilometres north. It was also responsible for providing conscripts with training in the Picton, Casula, Greta, Holsworthy, and Tomago areas near Sydney.

The brigade's War Diary records that a week before the Battle of the Coral Sea of 4–7 May 1942, it was ordered on 29 April to move from Tomago near Newcastle to Greta in preparation for embarkation to Port Moresby, New Guinea. (Note: "TOMAGO, 30 April, Received message 2 Div to be prepared to proceed to Port Moresby following concentration at Greta", in the 14th Brigade War Diary 1 April 1942 to 30 April 1942, Australian War Memorial collection document AWM52 8/2/14) The Battle of the Coral Sea saw the Japanese suffer a naval defeat, which forced them to refocus their efforts on securing Port Moresby by an overland attack across the Owen Stanley Range along the Kokoda Track from beachheads in the Buna–Gona–Sanananda area of north-east Papua New Guinea.

In April 1942, the Australian New Guinea Administrative Unit (ANGAU) administered Papua New Guinea from Port Moresby under Major General Basil Morris. The main force of troops in New Guinea at this time, was the 30th Brigade, consisting of militia troops who had arrived at Port Moresby in January 1942.

The Anglican Bishop of New Guinea from 1936 to 1962, Sir Philip Strong, was in Port Moresby in April 1942 and recorded in his diary: "Went to the Rectory ... The whole place had been ransacked... Apparently all houses in Port Moresby are the same and all this looting has been done by the [Australian] military". At this time, these troops were under Morris' command.

Smith arrived at Port Moresby on 21 May 1942 and was firstly based at Port Moresby as commander of the 14th Brigade. His Officer's Record of Service records the following entry:

23.10.39 To comd. 14 Inf. Bde.
18.3.43 Relq commd. of 14 Inf Bde & is trans to Reserve of Officers in Hon Rank of Brig. (Note: Officer's Record of Service, Walter Edmund Smith, can be found at the Australian War Memorial archive.)

From the outset, he strongly opposed Morris. Smith later said:

[I] immediately on landing found myself at cross purposes with the Military administration. ... I decided to stand firm and adopted a really tough attitude. ... Numerous attempts were made to humiliate me ... [but] I fought back, and in most of the violent clashes with high authorities I managed to wriggle out of the trouble and leave them ... in the wrong...

Smith strongly criticised Army supply and Intelligence failures. In early 1943, hthreatened Major General George Vasey with tabling Army documents in Australian Federal Parliament. These related to what Smith regarded as the needless sacrifice of Australian lives in the Gona–Buna–Sanananda area.

== Criticism of Smith's leadership ==
The official Australian history of the early New Guinea campaign refers to Smith's leadership, saying: "...the inexperienced and poorly trained 14th Brigade was chosen..."; "...the inexperienced 14th Brigade was sent forward...". Peter Brune in his popular book, Those Ragged Bloody Heroes, says: "The Army reinforced Port Moresby with a poorly trained and ill-led 14th Brigade...". The Official History adds that its criticism of the Brigade is not a criticism of the troops themselves: "This [inexperience] is no reflection on their courage, but units contained a large number of young men not yet properly developed or trained". Author Raymond Paull quoting Lieutenant General Sydney Rowell says: "Had ... the 14th Brigade been sufficiently well trained ... there is no doubt that the enemy would have been prevented from penetrating the Owen Stanley Range". Though this claim now seems absurd, (Note: The Japanese forces had distinct superiority in numbers and battle experience (Jeffrey Grey, The Australian Centenary History of Defence, Vol. I, The Australian Army, page 143).) it must be taken as a deep criticism of Smith's command. His name was omitted from the official Australian Government history of the New Guinea Campaign. He was mentioned in two volumes of the official Australian history of the First World War.

== Comments from troops ==
Four brigade members, Ken Laycock, Frank Budden, Stan Brigg, and Colin Kennedy, later published accounts of the New Guinea Campaign. Kennedy (3rd Battalion) wrote: "It was the stiff training ... at Greta which helped "B" company through its initial ordeal [in New Guinea]", while Stan and Les Brigg (36th Battalion) recorded that the "...period of training [in Australia] saw the foundation laid for a sound unit". Laycock, however, criticises the training, saying it was too tough, although Smith's training program was found to be adequate for use elsewhere in the Australian Army. On 7 December 1942, former 14th Brigade officer Paul Williams wrote: (Note: In a 7 December 1942 letter from former 14th Brigade HQ Officer Paul Williams of 129 Lawson St, Hamilton, NSW, to Brig. Smith.) "...Brig. A. A. Brackpool ... remarked that the system of training as laid down by the 14 Bde was what he was [using]..." Historian David Horner notes: "...while his [Brig. Smith's] troops were training in the Hexham area [west of Sydney] he worked them fifteen hours a day for weeks..."

== Letters and memoirs ==
In his memoirs, Smith says:

Immediately on landing [at Port Moresby in May 1942, I] found myself at cross purposes with the Military administration. ... I decided to stand firm and adopted a really tough attitude. ... Numerous attempts were made to humiliate me ... [but] I fought back, and in most of the violent clashes with high authorities I managed to wriggle out of the trouble and leave them ... in the wrong. ... One evening [in February 1943] I received a signal to board an aircraft at 3:00 am the following morning, and I returned to Sydney. ... Some months later I received a telegram placing me on the Reserve of Officers list thus ending my military career – unhonoured and unsung without even a "thank you" or a letter of appreciation ... for a lifetime of loyal and enthusiastic service encompassing two world wars. I was greatly hurt and very bitter ... on my return to civilian life at this cowardly and unjust treatment...

On 16 January 1943, in a letter home Smith wrote:

HQrs 14 Aust Inf. Bde, ... This is just the commencement of a fight which I will carry through to the bitter end, and will not hesitate to place the whole of the facts before the bar of the Federal House if necessary. As you have no doubt gathered from some of my previous letters I have not been removed from my command, but have had the units of my Bde taken from me one by one ... [H]ad I been forward during the recent ops, I would have been made the scapegoat for many things. As it is I've given Maj. Gen. V. [Vasey] such a headache, that all the aspros [headache tablets] on this island won't cure it.

Smith's personal web site (Note: "Web Site of Walter Edmond Smith.) maintained by his family claims that these comments made under war-time censorship referred to the military orders, a copy which Smith had in his possession, for the needless sacrifice of Australian troops in the area of the Japanese beachheads. Other authors support the claim of needless sacrifice, including Peter Brune who uses phrases such as "The Gona slaughter was in full spate"; "...wanton waste of an already diminished force"; and "...the brave 25th Brigade at Gona, riddled with disease and stunned by horrendous casualties..." to describe the campaign. Other opinions, include those of Harry Katekar, adjutant of 2/27th Battalion, who said:

We were thrown in [at Gona] with scant information about the enemy; no aerial photographs, nothing to go on. I don't recall even seeing a proper plan of the area ... The whole thing was rushed and therefore one can expect ... what actually transpired – a slaughter of good men!" (reported by Peter Brune).

Raymond Paull says: "...the Allied victory crowned a futile, bloody slaughter" while Collin Kennedy wrote that "By the time Gona fell the total cost for the Australians was shattering". The sentiment was echoed by Timothy Hall: "MacArthur's relentless desire to drive on for victory ... cost many unnecessary lives".

== After the war ==
During the war, WE Smith Engineering Pty Ltd moved from the Rocks area of Sydney to the bays between the arches under the northern ramp of the Sydney Harbour Bridge. In the mid-1960s, the firm entered into a joint venture with CWF Hamilton and Co. of Christchurch, New Zealand, to make and sell Hamilton jet boats (Note: Hamilton jet boat history and Hamilton Jet Web site.) in Australia. In 1968, the firm received the first significant New South Wales state decentralisation grant, and moved about 450 kilometres (280 mi) north to the coastal city of Coffs Harbour.
