= 7th Light Horse Regiment (Australia) =

Australian Army mounted regiment

- 7th Light Horse Regiment hat badge
- Active: 1914–1919; 1921–1943
- Country: Australia
- Branch: Australian Army
- Type: Mounted infantry
- Size: Regiment
- Part of: 2nd Light Horse Brigade
- Engagements: First World War: North African Campaign; Gallipoli campaign; Sinai and Palestine Campaign

Insignia
- Unit colour patch

The 7th Light Horse Regiment was a mounted infantry regiment of the Australian Army during the First World War. The regiment was raised in October 1914, and assigned to the 2nd Light Horse Brigade. The regiment fought against the forces of the Ottoman Empire, in Egypt, at Gallipoli, on the Sinai Peninsula, and in Palestine and Jordan. After the armistice the regiment eventually returned to Australia in March 1919. For its role in the war the regiment was awarded sixteen battle honours. During the inter-war years, the regiment was re-raised as a part-time unit based in New South Wales. It was later converted to a motor regiment during the Second World War but was disbanded in late 1943 without having been deployed overseas.

== Formation ==
The 7th Light Horse Regiment was raised at Sydney in October 1914. and comprised twenty-five officers and 497 other ranks serving in three squadrons, each of six troops. Each troop was divided into eight sections, of four men each. In action one man of each section, was nominated as a horse holder reducing the regiments rifle strength by a quarter. Its manpower being mostly recruited from residents of New South Wales. Once formed, the regiment was assigned to the 2nd Light Horse Brigade, serving alongside the 5th and 6th Light Horse Regiments.

All Australian Light Horse regiments used cavalry unit designations, but were mounted infantry armed with rifles, not swords or lances, and mounted exclusively on the Australian Waler horse.

== Operational history ==
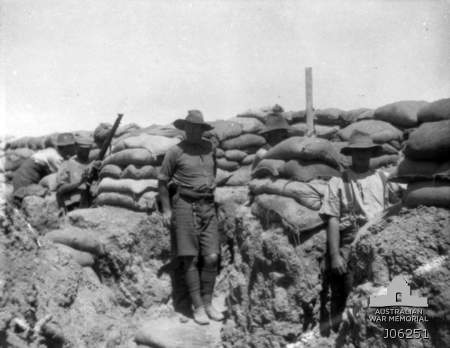
7th Light Horse at Gallipoli

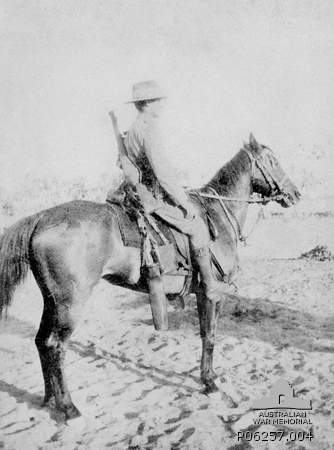
7th Light Horse Regiment signaller

=== Gallipoli ===
In December 1914, the 7th Light Horse Regiment left Sydney for Egypt, arriving on 1 February 1915. When the Australian infantry units were dispatched to Gallipoli, it was thought the terrain was unsuitable for mounted troops, and the light horse regiments remained in Egypt. However, heavy casualties amongst the Australian infantry resulted in the deployment of the 2nd Light Horse Brigade as reinforcements in May 1915. On arrival the regiment was attached to the 1st Division, who by this stage of the campaign were fighting a defensive battle around the beachhead around Anzac Cove. The regiment was withdrawn back to Egypt at the end of the campaign in December 1915.

=== Sinai and Palestine Campaign ===
On their arrival back in Egypt, the 2nd Light Horse Brigade was assigned to the newly raised ANZAC Mounted Division, at first given responsibility for the defence of the Suez Canal. Their first battles were at Romani and Katia in early August 1916. They were then used to patrol the large open area of Sinai, until the British advance into Palestine, subsequently becoming involved in the unsuccessful first, second battles of Gaza in March and April 1916. They then took part in the successful Battle of Beersheba in the following October.

With the Ottoman Empire forces in retreat, the regiment was part of the pursuit into Palestine, resulting in the capture of Jerusalem in 1917, and raid across the River Jordan, at Amman and Es Salt. The war in the Middle East ended shortly afterwards when the armistice of Mudros was signed in October 1918. The regiment returned to Egypt to assist in putting down a revolt, then sailed for Australia in June 1919. The war cost the regiment 165 killed and 655 wounded.

== Perpetuation ==
In 1921, the decision was made to perpetuate the honours and traditions of the AIF by reorganising the units of the Citizens Force to replicate the numerical designations of their related AIF units. As a result, the 7th Light Horse was re-raised as a part-time unit based in the 2nd Military District, which encompassed the majority of the state of New South Wales; in doing so, it assumed the lineage of several previously existing militia units, including the 11th Light Horse (Australian Horse), which had been formed in 1912, and the 3rd Australian Light Horse Regiment (Australian Horse), which had been formed in 1903 as part of the amalgamation of Australia's colonial forces into the Australian Army after Federation.

In early 1937, the regiment was amalgamated with the 21st Light Horse to form the 7th/21st Light Horse (Australian Horse); however, the two units were split again later the same year. The unit remained on the order of battle throughout the rest of the inter-war years, and upon the outbreak of the Second World War, the 7th Light Horse formed part of the 6th Cavalry Brigade, headquartered around Goulburn, New South Wales. On 14 March 1942, the 7th was converted into a motor regiment, adopting the designation of the 7th Motor Regiment (Australian Horse). As the Australian Army undertook a partial demobilisation, the regiment was deemed surplus to requirements and in November 1943 it was disbanded without having seen operational service during the war. During the war years, the regiment was variously assigned to the 4th and 2nd Motor Brigades.

In the post-war period, the regiment was re-raised as an amalgamated unit, designated the 7th/21st Australian Horse. Formed in July 1948, this unit was established as a reconnaissance regiment within the 2nd Division, and remained in existence until 15 September 1957 when it was disbanded; its personnel were later used to re-raise the 4th Infantry Battalion, which later became part of the Royal New South Wales Regiment.

== Commanding officers ==
The following officers commanded the 7th Light Horse during the First World War:

- Lieutenant Colonel John McLean Arnott CMG
- Lieutenant Colonel George Macleay Macarthur-Onslow CMG, DSO
- Lieutenant Colonel John Dalyell Richardson

== Battle honours ==
The 7th Light Horse Regiment was awarded the following battle honours:

- ANZAC · Defence at ANZAC · Suvla · Sari Bair · Gallipoli 1915–1916 · Egypt 1915–1917 · Romani · Gaza-Beersheba · El Mughar · Nebi Samwill · Jerusalem · Jordan (Es Salt) · Jordan (Amman) · Megiddo · Nablus · Palestine 1917–1918.

== Cartoons ==
From the sketch book of the 7th light horse trooper, Lieutenant P.V. Ryan:

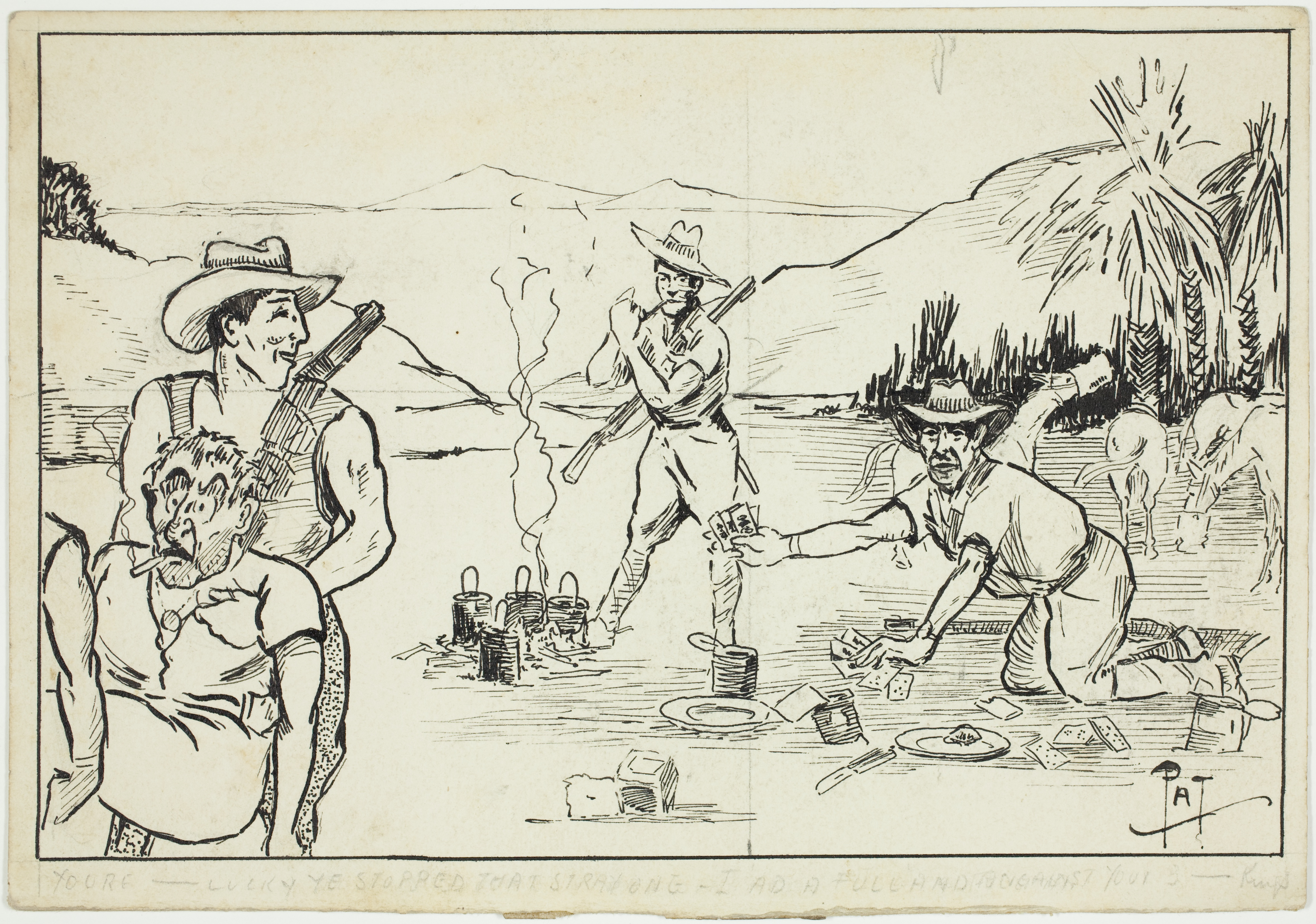
"YOURE - LUCKY YE STOPPED THAT STRAY ONE - I AD A FULL AND AGAINST YOU"

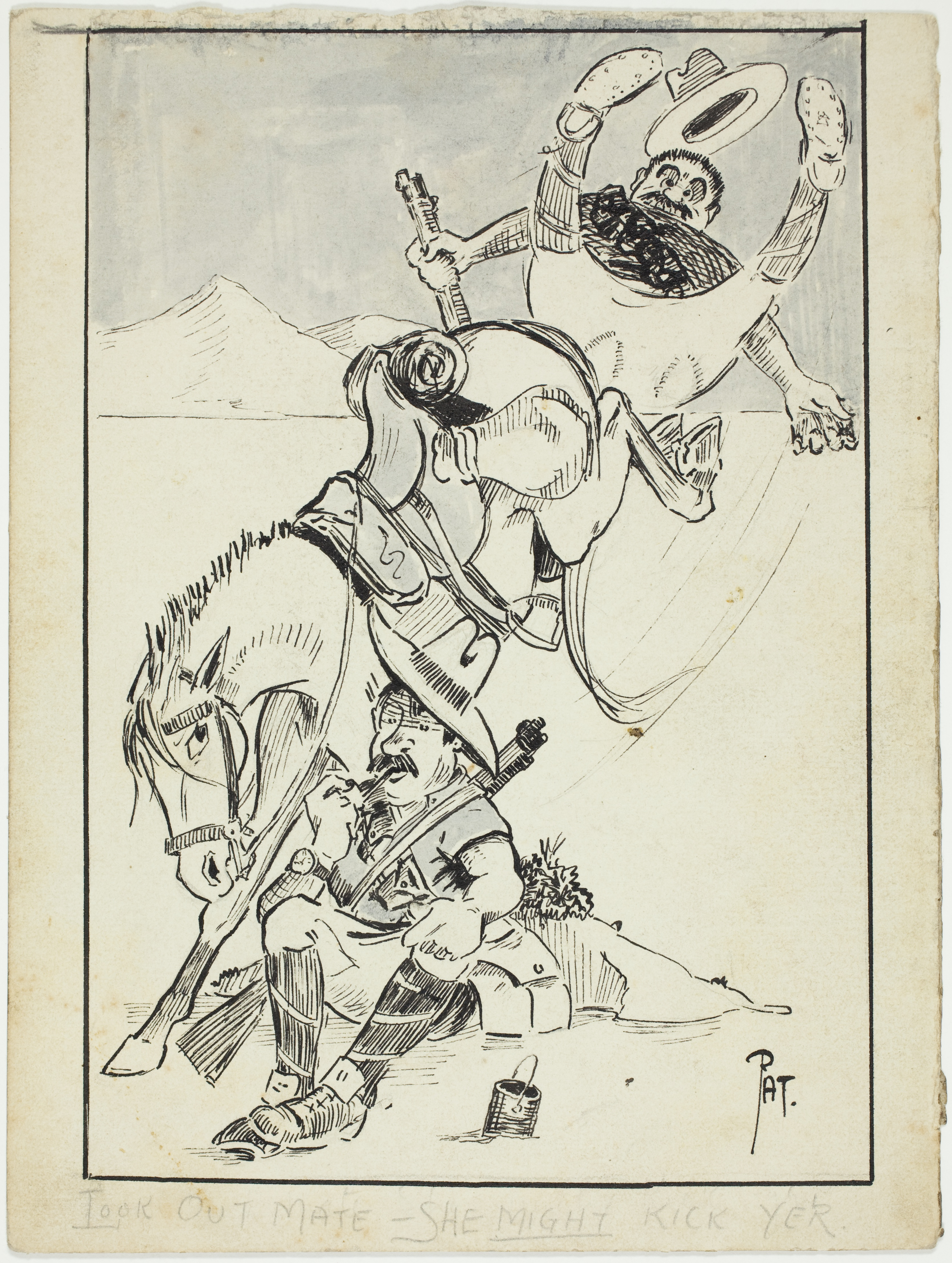
"LOOK OUT MATE - SHE MIGHT KICK YER"

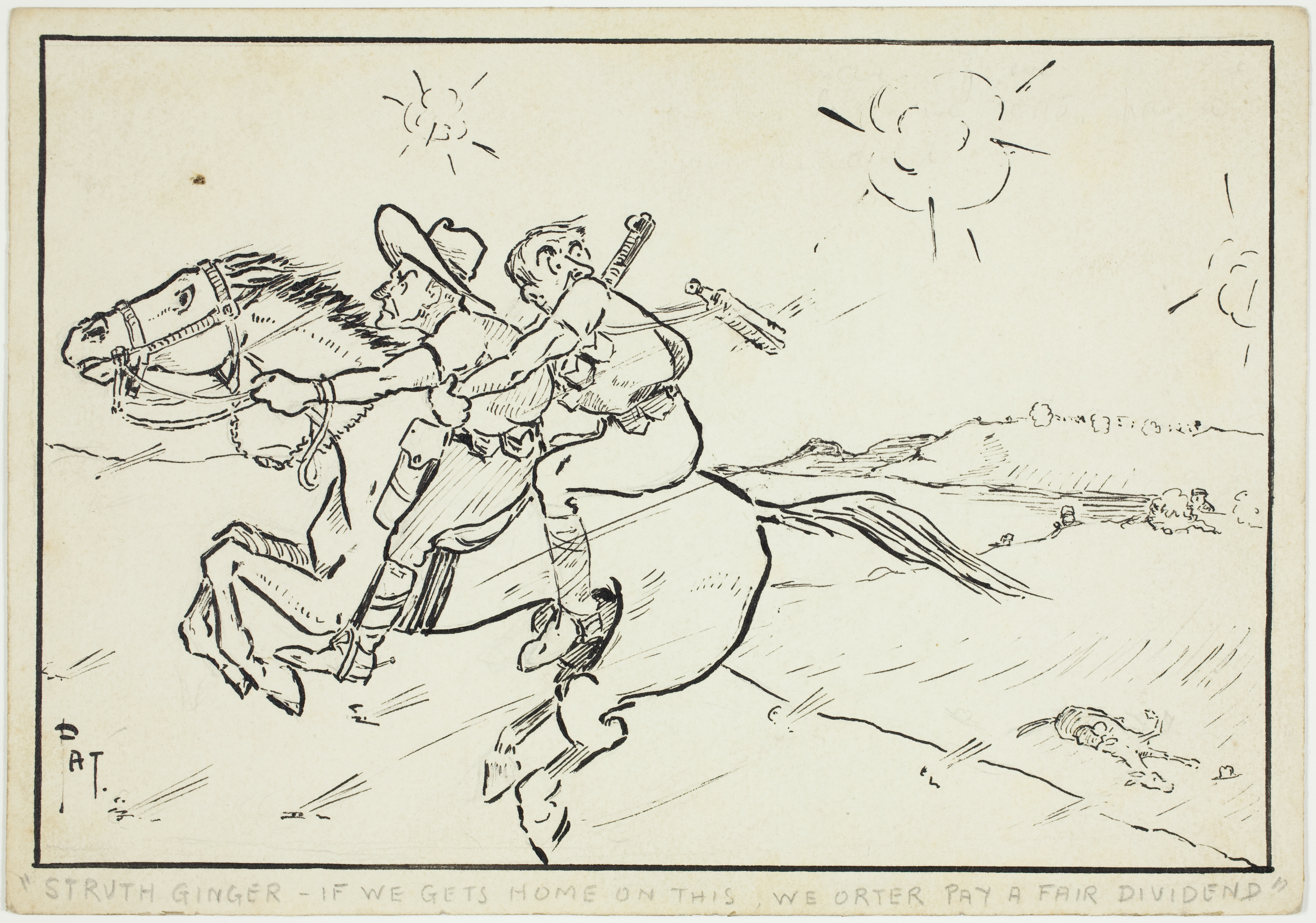
"Struth Ginger - If we gets home from this we orter pay a fair dividend"

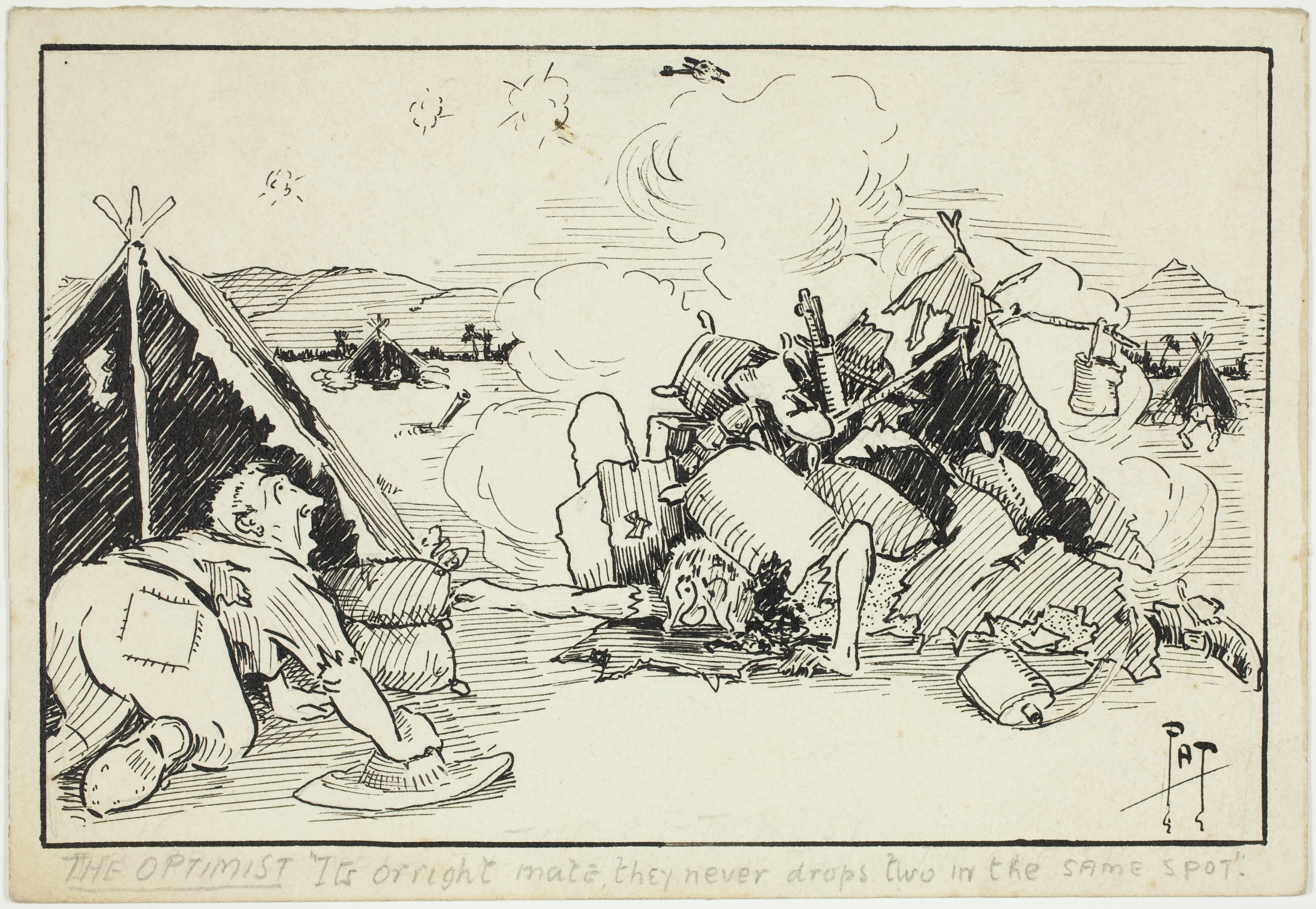
THE OPTIMIST It's orright mate they never drops two in the SAME SPOT

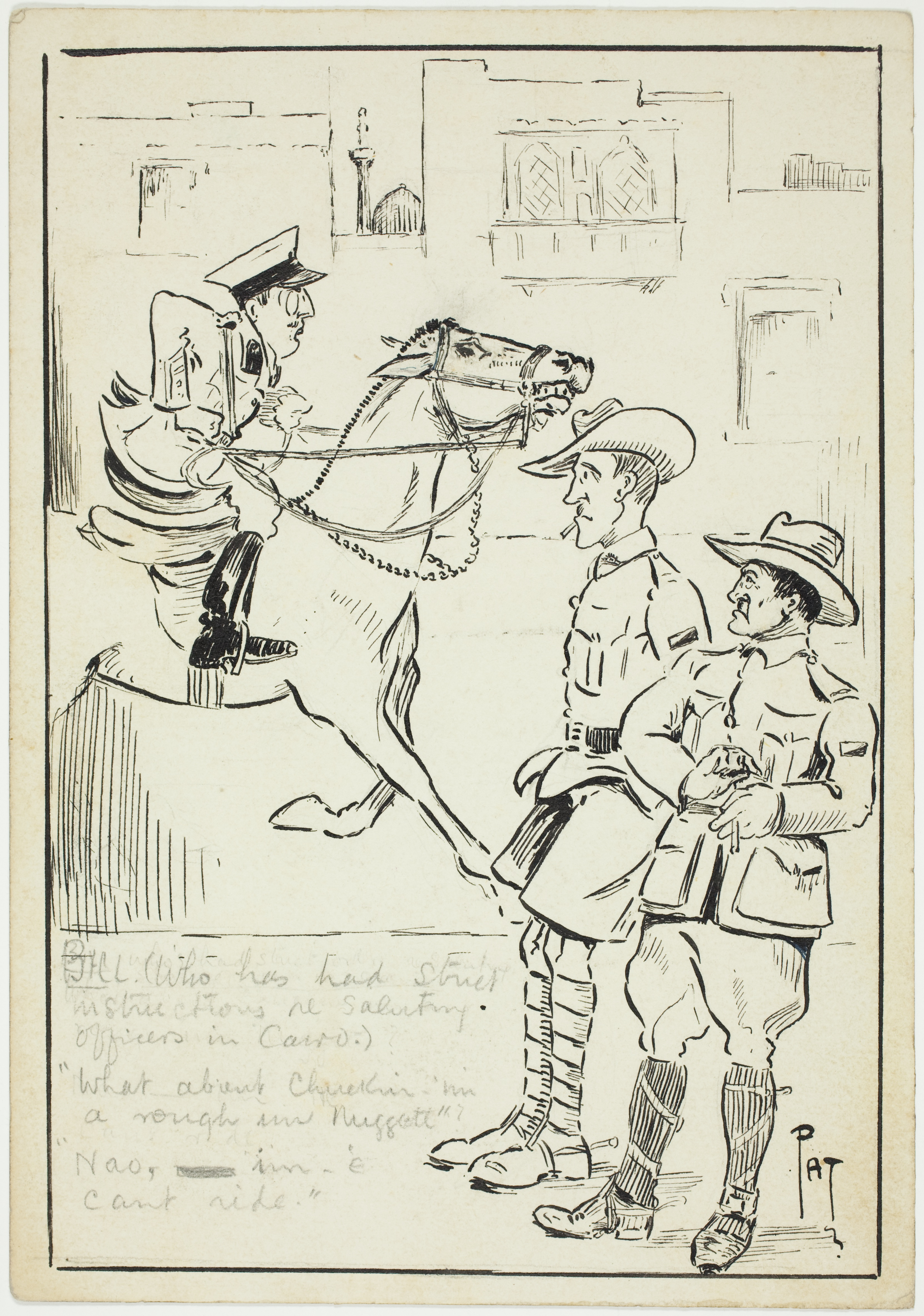
BILL (Who has had strict instructions re saluting officers in Cairo.) "What about chuckin 'im a rough one(?) Nuggett?"

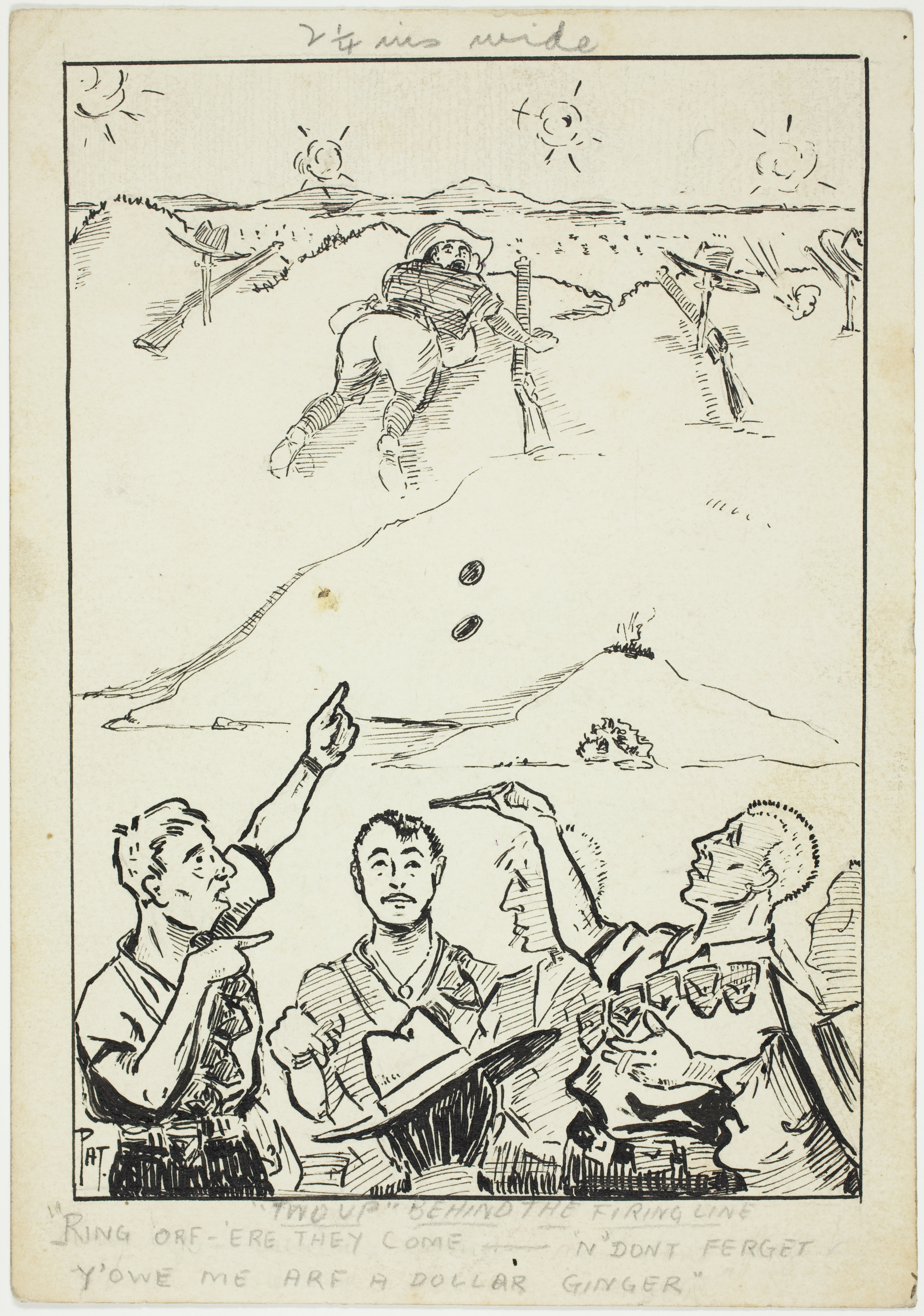
"TWO UP" BEHIND THE FIRING LINE "RING ORF - 'ERE THEY COME - 'N' DONT FERGET Y'OWE ME ARF A DOLLAR GINGER"

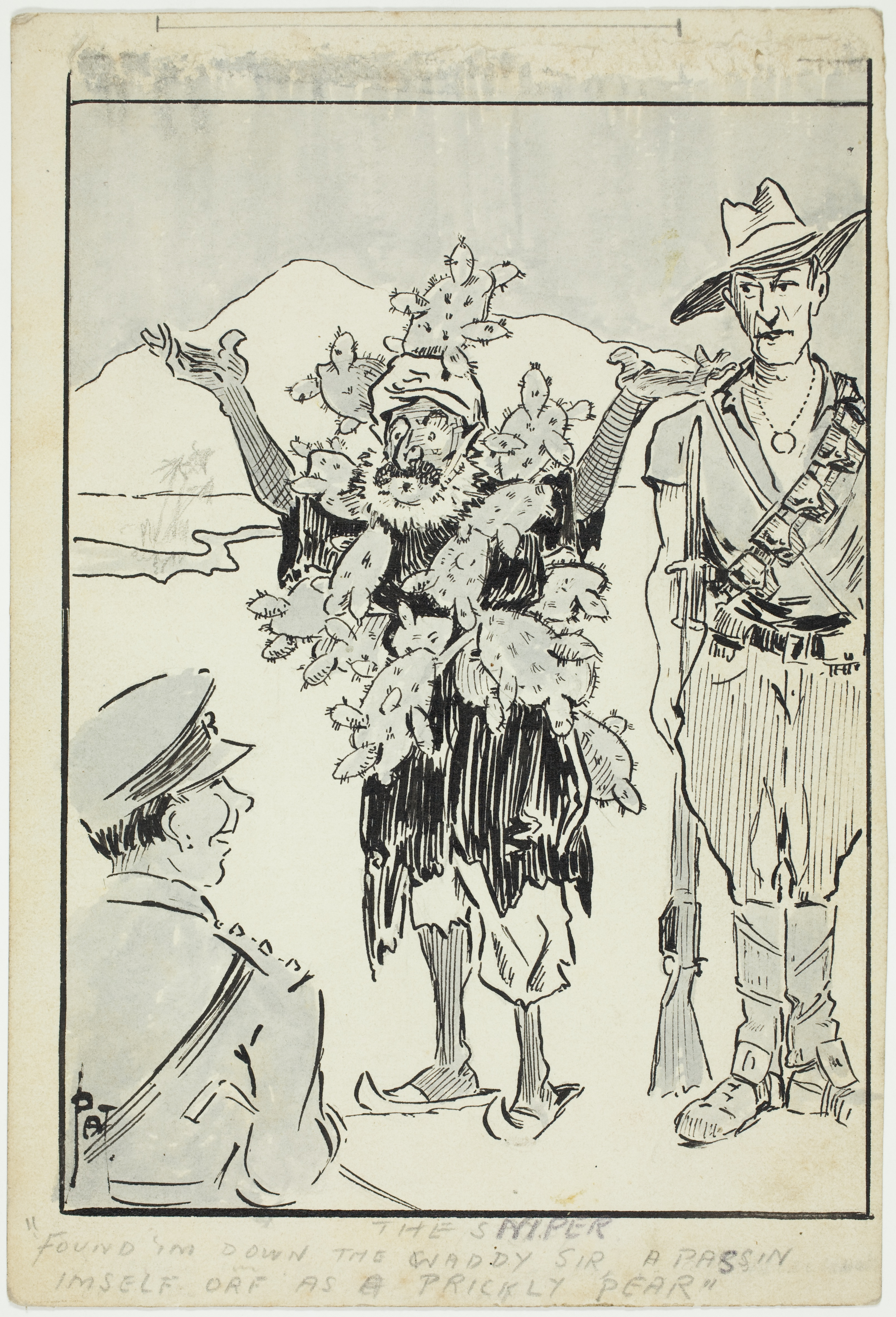
THE SNIPER "Found im down the WADDY SIR A PASSIN IMSELF OFF AS A PRICKLY PEAR"
