= Percy William Woods =

- Born: 8 November 1885; Sydney, New South Wales, Australia
- Died: 5 January 1937 (aged 51); Sydney, New South Wales, Australia
- Military career
- Allegiance: Australia
- Branch: Australian Army
- Service years: 1914–1919
- Rank: Lieutenant Colonel
- Unit: 55th Battalion
- Conflicts: First World War: Gallipoli Campaign; Western Front
- Awards: Distinguished Service Order; Military Cross; Mentioned in Despatches

Lieutenant-Colonel Percy William Woods DSO MC (8 November 1885 – 5 January 1937) was a decorated Australian army officer of the First World War.

Woods was born in Sydney, New South Wales, the son of Frederick Woods of London and Isabel (née England) of Melbourne. In September 1914, Woods enlisted as a private in the Australian Imperial Force. He served in Egypt and was mentioned in dispatches.

In February 1916, Woods was transferred to the 55th Battalion of the Australian Army. For his courage at the Battle of Fromelles in July 1916, he was awarded the Military Cross in the 1917 New Year Honours. He was promoted to Lieutenant-Colonel and was awarded the Distinguished Service Order in the 1918 New Year Honours for his leadership during the capture of Doignies, France.

Upon returning home, he worked as a clothing manufacturer, but gassing from the war left him disabled by pulmonary fibrosis. In 1932, he applied for disability benefits, which were denied by the Repatriation Commission "on the ground that his ill health was not due to war service." He appealed this decision, and multiple witnesses testified that Woods had been gassed on three occasions and yet had refused evacuation from the front line. His appeal was accepted and he was granted a pension, which was increased in 1933 when he became totally incapacitated.

Woods died in Sydney of cerebrovascular disease in 1937. Among the mourners at his service were 42 members of the 55th Battalion.
