= Alick Bryant =

Australian soldier

Alick James Bryant
- Born: 7 April 1903; Ashfield, New South Wales
- Died: 14 November 1985 (aged 82); Narrabeen, New South Wales
- Military career
- Allegiance: Australia
- Branch: First Australian Imperial Force
- Service years: 1917–1919
- Rank: Private
- Unit: 4th Battalion, AIF
- Conflicts: World War I; German Spring Offensive
- Awards: British War Medal; Victory Medal

Alick James Bryant (also known as James John Bryant; 7 April 1903 – 14 November 1985) is believed to have been the youngest Australian soldier to serve during the First World War. He was only 13 years 339 days old when he enlisted in the Australian Imperial Force (AIF) on 12 March 1917.

== Biography ==
Bryant was born on 7 April 1903 to Louisa and George Bryant in Ashfield, New South Wales. His father was a produce merchant in Ashfield, and both parents were 25 years old. He applied to enlist in the AIF on 2 March 1917, giving his age as 18. He successfully enlisted on 12 March 1917, and was described on his enlistment papers as being 5 ft 3½ inches tall, of fair complexion and with light brown hair.

Bryant embarked on HMAT A23 Suffolk at Sydney on 24 April 1917 and disembarked at Plymouth on 17 June 1917, before being sent to the 1st Training Battalion at Sutton Veny on Salisbury Plain. From midnight on 18 December he went absent without leave until 0900 on 20 December. He was admonished by Lieutenant Colonel R.B.Jacobs and forfeited two days' pay. On 29 December he was sent to Sutton Veny Military Hospital with tonsillitis, and returned to his unit on 12 January 1918.

On 18 January he sailed from Southampton to France. He was taken on the strength of the 4th Battalion in the field on 14 March 1918 with battalion number 7208. At that time the 4th Battalion was in the Somme valley. On 26 March, Alick Bryant was admitted to the ambulance train, as a result of exposure to gas, and then to 59th General Hospital at St.Omer on 28 March. He was transferred to England on 13 April. Until 6 June he remained in hospital, at the 2nd Australian Auxiliary Hospital in Southall, and returned to the 1st Training Battalion on 14 June. On the 11 June, AIF Headquarters at Horseferry Road in London received a cablegram giving Bryant's true date-of-birth. Approval was granted on 15 June for him to be discharged, under age, but that he was not to forfeit any pay. Bryant was transferred to No. 2 Command Depot, Weymouth, on 20 June to await embarkation. He returned to Australia on board the City of Karachi and was discharged on 7 November 1918.

On 16 June 1919 he again applied to join the AIF, and admitted on the attestation form that he had been discharged for being under age, the previous year. He entered his age on the form as 18 years 2 months, although still only 16 years 2 months old, and stated that he had been born on 7 April 1901. Alick Bryant was again discharged, "services no longer required", on 3 July 1919 after three weeks. It appears that he then applied to join the Royal Australian Navy on 21 July 1919, and signed up for seven years. He still gave his name as James John Bryant, but then gave his date-of-birth as 7 April 1900. He was posted to the depot ship HMAS Penguin as a second cook's mate on 21 July. His character was assessed as very good, and his abilities satisfactory, but on 23 July he was again to be discharged, this time on 12 August 1919.

On 31 March 1937, Bryant wrote a letter to the officer in charge of base records to ask whether he could have a copy of his discharge papers, because the originals had been accidentally burnt when he moved house. He explained that he needed the papers because Enfield Council were giving first preference for jobs to returned soldiers. He then admitted that he gave a false name and date of birth when he originally joined the AIF. He explained that his real name was Alick James Bryant, and that he was born on 7 April 1903. He received a reply dated 9 April saying that as he had used a false name he had to supply a Statutory Declaration stating that he had served under an assumed name, and give his true name. On 19 March 1939, he again wrote to the officer in charge of base records to ask if he could have a duplicate returned soldiers badge as it had been lost. He again had to produce a Statutory Declaration signed by a Justice of the Peace saying how he had lost the badge and received a replacement on 18 April 1939.

Alick James Bryant died, aged 82, on 14 November 1985 in the War Veterans' Home, Narrabeen, New South Wales.
