= 7th/21st Light Horse Regiment (Australia) =

Australian Army mounted regiment

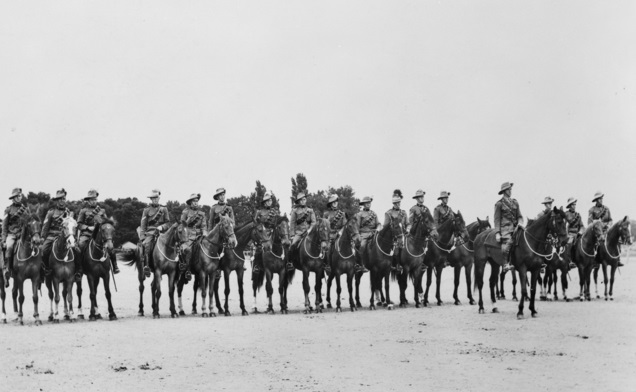
- C Squadron, 7th/21st Light Horse, Canberra, 1936
- Active: 1936–1937; 1948–1957
- Country: Australia
- Branch: Australian Army
- Type: Mounted infantry
- Size: Regiment
- Nickname(s): Australian Horse

The 7th/21st Light Horse Regiment was a mounted infantry regiment of the Australian Army. Initially formed in 1936 through the amalgamation of two previously existing light horse regiments, the 7th/21st was formed as a part time unit in the state of New South Wales. It was split again in 1937. During the Second World War, the two constituent regiments undertook defensive duties in Australia before being disbanded in late 1943. The 7th/21st was re-raised in the post war period, in 1948, as a reconnaissance regiment with the 2nd Division. It remained on the order of battle until late 1957 when its personnel were used to re-raise an infantry unit, which eventually formed part of the Royal New South Wales Regiment.

== History ==
A part-time unit of the Citizen Force, the regiment was originally formed on 1 October 1936 through the amalgamation of two previously existing Australian Light Horse regiments: the 7th and 21st, both of which were based in the state of New South Wales. This proved only a brief existence as on 1 July 1937, as the Australian Army expanded in response to fears about war in Europe, the two regiments were split again. By 1938, both regiments formed part of the 4th Cavalry Brigade. During the Second World War, these regiments both gave up their horses and were mechanised, with the 7th being converting to a motor regiment (the 7th Motor Regiment) and the 21st becoming a reconnaissance battalion (the 21st Reconnaissance Battalion) and then a divisional cavalry regiment (the 21st Divisional Cavalry Regiment); nevertheless, neither served overseas and both were eventually disbanded as surplus to Army requirements in November and December 1943 having never seen combat.

In the post war period, the 7th/21st was re-raised in July 1948 as Australia's part-time military force was re-formed following the demobilisation of the wartime military. Raised as a reconnaissance regiment within the 2nd Division, the regiment perpetuated the battle honours that the 7th Light Horse had received for its service during the First World War, and those that had been entrusted to the 21st Light Horse. Upon re-formation in the 1948, the regiment adopted the designation of the "7th/21st Reconnaissance Regiment", although this was changed the following year to the "7th/21st Australian Horse", perpetuating the territorial designation of the 7th Light Horse. The regiment was disbanded in September 1957, and its personnel were used to re-raise the 4th Infantry Battalion, which later became part of the Royal New South Wales Regiment.
