= Alexander Buckley =

Australian recipient of the Victoria Cross

Alexander Henry Buckley VC
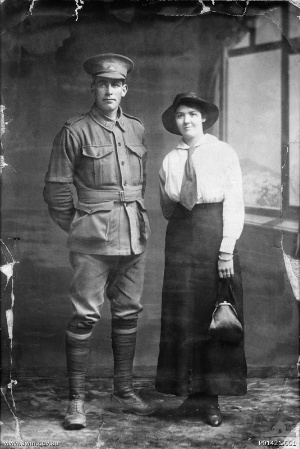
- Buckley and his fiancée c. 1916
- Born: 22 July 1891; Gulargambone, New South Wales
- Died: 2 September 1918 (aged 27); Mont Saint-Quentin, France
- Military career
- Allegiance: Australia
- Branch: Australian Imperial Force
- Service years: 1916–1918
- Rank: Corporal
- Units: 54th Battalion
- Conflicts: First World War; Western Front; Second Battle of Bullecourt; Battle of Passchendaele; Battle of Polygon Wood; Battle of Broodseinde; Second Battle of the Somme; Battle of Mont Saint-Quentin †
- Awards: Victoria Cross

Alexander Henry Buckley, VC (22 July 1891 – 2 September 1918) was an Australian recipient of the Victoria Cross, the highest award for gallantry in the face of the enemy that can be awarded to British and Commonwealth forces.

== Early life ==
Buckley was born on 22 July 1891 to James and Julia Buckley at Gulargambone, New South Wales, Australia. One of four children, he was home schooled on his parents' property Homebush during his childhood. After completing his schooling, he worked on the family farm with his father.

== Military career ==
Buckley enlisted in the Australian Imperial Force on 3 February 1916, volunteering for overseas service. After completing basic training at Bathurst, New South Wales in June, he was sent to England among a draft of reinforcements. Just prior to departing Australia, Buckley became engaged. He was posted to 54th Battalion, an infantry battalion assigned to the 14th Brigade, which was part of the 5th Division.

Joining the battalion on the Western Front in November 1916 at Flers, France, Buckley served with it as it manned defensive positions along the Somme during the winter months. The following year, after the Germans withdrew towards the Hindenburg Line, Buckley took part in the fighting around Bullecourt, Polygon Wood and Broodseinde and in November 1917 he was promoted to temporary corporal. In August 1918, the 54th Battalion took part in the initial stages of the Allied Hundred Days Offensive around Amiens. On the night of 1/2 September 1918, at Peronne, France, during the Battle of Mont Saint-Quentin, Buckley performed the deeds that led to him being posthumously awarded the Victoria Cross.

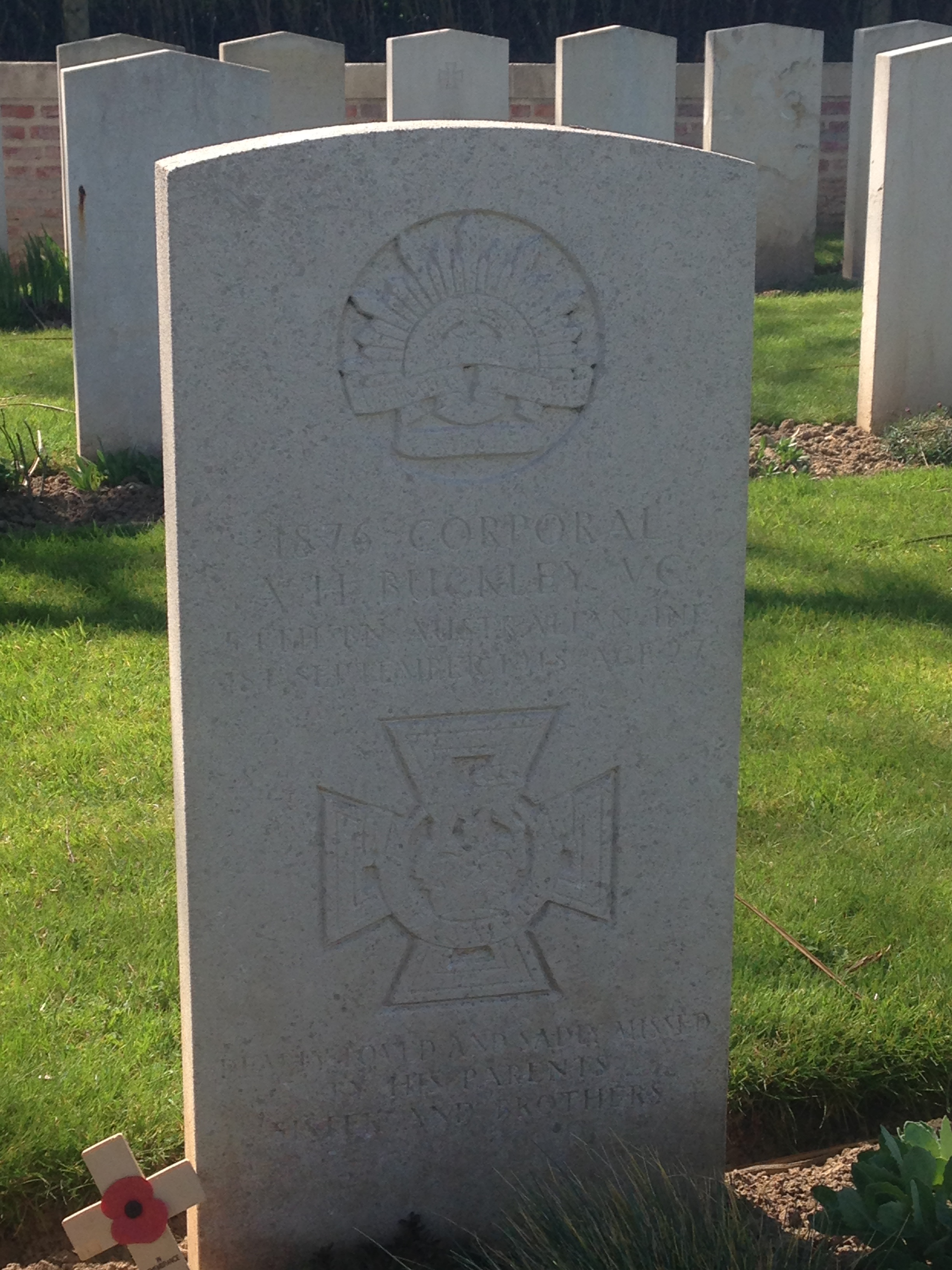
Buckley's headstone at Peronne Communal Cemetery

He was originally buried at St Radegonde, but was later re-interred at Peronne Communal Cemetery Extension.

=== Citation ===
For most conspicuous bravery and self-sacrifice at Peronne during the operations on the 1st/2nd Sept. 1918. After passing the first objective his half company and part of the company on the flank were held up by a machine gun nest. With one man he rushed the post shooting four of the occupants and taking 22 prisoners. Later on reaching a moat, it was found that another machine gun nest commanded the only available footbridge. Whilst this was being engaged from a flank Cpl. Buckley endeavoured to cross the bridge and rush the post, but was killed in the attempt. Throughout the advance he had displayed great initiative, resource and courage, and by his efforts to save his comrades from casualties, he set a fine example of self-sacrificing devotion to duty.

— The London Gazette, 14 December 1918

== Medals ==
Buckley's Victoria Cross is displayed at the Australian War Memorial in Canberra. He also earned the British War Medal and the Victory Medal.

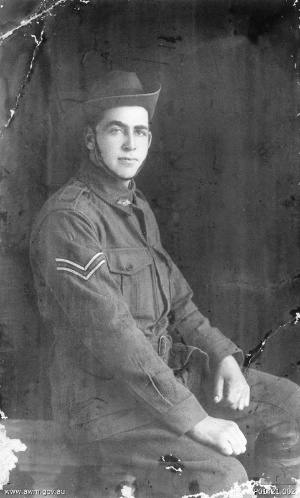

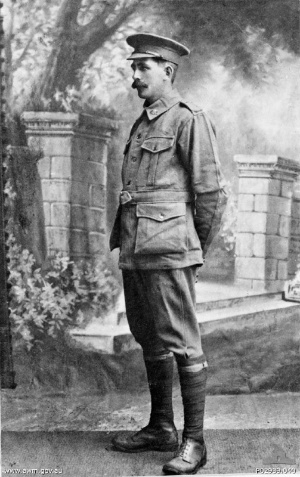

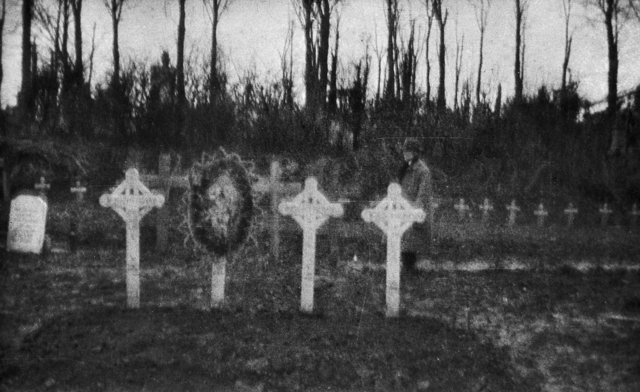

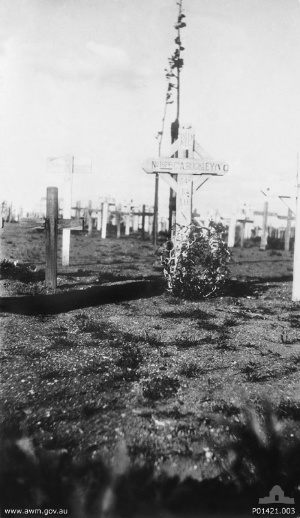
