= 54th Battalion (Australia) =

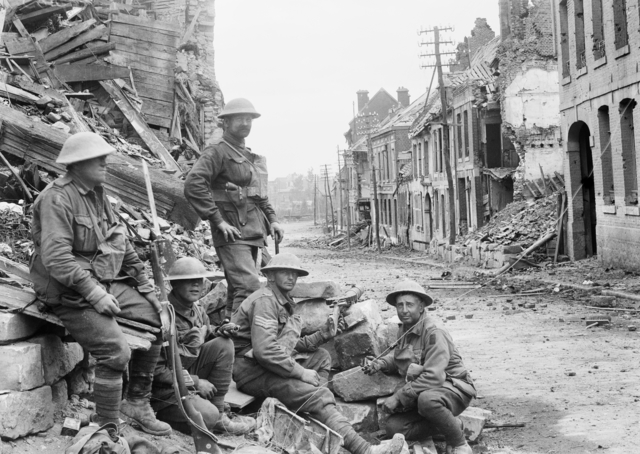
- 54th Battalion in Peronne, September 1918
- Active: 1916–1919; 1921–1929; 1939–1944
- Country: Australia
- Branch: Australian Army
- Type: Infantry
- Size: ~900–1,000 officers and men
- Part of: 14th Brigade, 5th Division (WWI); 5th Brigade, 2nd Division (WWII)
- Engagements: World War I: Western Front; World War II

Insignia
- Unit colour patch

The 54th Battalion was an infantry battalion of the Australian Army. It was originally raised in 1916 for service during World War I and took part in the fighting in the trenches of the Western Front in France and Belgium before being amalgamated with the 56th Battalion in late 1918 following the German spring offensive that reduced the numbers in both battalions. The battalion was re-raised in 1921 as a part-time unit in New South Wales before being amalgamated with the 20th Battalion in 1929. At the outbreak of World War II, the battalion was reformed in its own right, undertaking garrison duties in Australia until being disbanded in 1944.

== History ==
=== World War I ===
The 54th Battalion was originally raised on 16 February 1916 during a reorganisation and expansion of the First Australian Imperial Force (AIF) that took place in Egypt following the Gallipoli campaign. This was achieved by transferring cadres of experienced personnel predominately from the 1st Division to the newly formed battalions and combining them with recently recruited personnel who had been dispatched as reinforcements from Australia. With an authorised strength of 1,023 men, the unit's first intake of personnel were drawn from men originating from New South Wales, many of whom had already served with the 2nd Battalion. Under the command of Lieutenant Colonel Walter Edmund Hutchinson Cass – a veteran of the Boer War who had commanded the 2nd Battalion at Gallipoli – the battalion became part of the 14th Brigade attached to the 5th Australian Division.

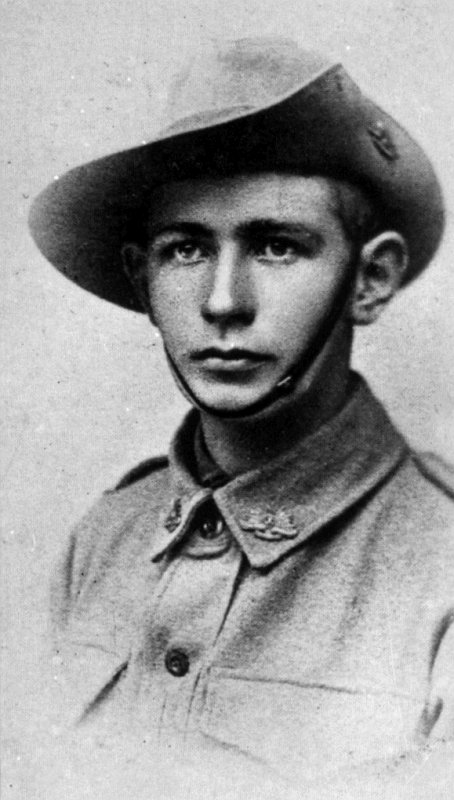
Arthur Hall, one of the 54th Battalion's two Victoria Cross recipients

After concentrating at Tel-el-Kebir, the battalion undertook a period of intense training culminating in a desert march to Moascar, before undertaking defensive duties along the Suez Canal. In mid-1916, the AIF's infantry divisions were sent to Europe to fight on the Western Front. After arriving at Marseille in June 1916, the battalion was committed to the fighting the following month. Amidst heavy fighting on the Somme, the 5th Division made the AIF's debut in Europe, launching a diversionary attack at Fromelles. The attack was disastrous for the Australians, and it was later described as "the worst 24 hours in Australia's entire history". Having gone in during the first wave of the assault, the 54th suffered heavily, losing 65 percent of its strength, equating to 20 officers and 518 other ranks. After the battle, the battalion regrouped at Bac-St-Maur before taking up defensive positions to the right of Bois Grenier. Reinforced, they remained at the front until September, rotating between the main defensive position and the village of Fleurbaix. Its final action in the area was a raid on the German trenches opposite their own.

After a month of rest, the battalion returned to the Somme in October, occupying the trenches around Flers, where they suffered further losses before being moved to the trenches around Le Transloy and Beaulencourt. After enduring the coldest winter in 40 years in the Somme, the 54th joined the Allied pursuit of the Germans as they withdrew to the Hindenburg Line in early 1917. During the Second Battle of Bullecourt it undertook a defensive role, which saw them repel an attack by troops from them Imperial Prussian Guard. A period of intense training behind the lines followed, before the battalion moved to the Ypres salient after the 5th Division was transferred to Belgium. In September, after playing a supporting role around the Menin Road, the 54th launched a major attack in September during the Battle of Polygon Wood, which was followed up in October with an action at Broodseinde. As winter arrived on the Western Front, the battalion rested behind the lines before occupying trenches along the Messines Ridge, holding a position around Wytschaete, against artillery attacks and occasional raids.

In early 1918, the capitulation of Tsarist Russia allowed the Germans to concentrate their strength on the Western Front, and they subsequently launched a major offensive. The strike came against the British southern flank, and as the Allies were pushed back towards the vital railhead at Amiens, the Australians were rushed from Flanders. Thrown into the line to stem the tide, the 54th mounted a strong defensive action around Villers-Bretonneux, during which its entire headquarters, including the battalion's commanding officer, Lieutenant Colonel David McConaghy, were killed. In August, the Allies launched their own offensive – the Hundred Days Offensive – which ultimately brought the war to an end. For their actions during the fighting in Anvil Wood, around Peronne, in early September, two members of the 54th Battalion – Alexander Buckley and Arthur Hall – received the Victoria Cross. The medieval walled town, surrounded by an unfordable river, was heavily defended by machine-gun nests, and during the assault the battalion, under the command of Lieutenant Colonel Norman Marshall, advanced through marshy ground over foot-bridges under fire while breaking into the position.

During late September and early October the battalion took part in the Battle of St. Quentin Canal, attacking at Bellicourt, which proved to be their final action of the war before they were withdrawn from the line. The Australian Corps had suffered heavy casualties during 1918, which they had been unable to replace. As a result, the Australian battalions were withdrawn from the line and reorganised in preparation for future operations. The 54th Battalion, as the most depleted battalion in the 14th Brigade, was chosen for amalgamation and was merged with the 56th Battalion on 11 October forming the "54th/56th Battalion". In response, the battalion's enlisted soldiers briefly went on strike in an effort to maintain their battalion identity, before complying with the order. Ultimately, the newly merged unit did not see any action before the war ended in November 1918. During the winter, the 54th/56th billeted at Charleroi, as the demobilisation process began. As its personnel were slowly repatriated back to Australia and its numbers dwindled, the amalgamated battalion was also merged with the rest of the 14th Brigade into one unit, with the 54th/56th Battalion disbanding on 10 April 1919. During the fighting, the 54th Battalion lost 544 killed in action or died on active service and 1,592 wounded. A total of 16 battle honours were bestowed upon the 54th for its involvement in the war in 1927.

=== Inter-war years and World War II ===
The battalion was reformed in 1921 as a unit of the Citizens Forces, Australia's part-time military force, following a re-organisation of the Army to perpetuate the numerical designations of the AIF. Based in New South Wales, it drew personnel from the 2nd Battalion, 54th Infantry Regiment and the 5th Battalion, 20th Infantry Regiment. In 1927, when territorial titles were adopted by the Army, the battalion became known as the "Lachlan-Macquarie Regiment", due to its location in the New South Wales region of the Lachlan and Macquarie Rivers, which were named after Lachlan Macquarie, a former governor of New South Wales; at the same time the battalion adopted the motto of Deo Patriae Tigi. Upon formation, the Citizen Forces battalions were maintained through a mixture of voluntary and compulsory service; however, in 1929, the Universal Training Scheme was abolished by the Scullin Labor government. As a result, in a decline in numbers, on 1 July 1929, the battalion was amalgamated with the 20th Battalion, forming the 20th/54th Battalion, as Australia's part-time military force was re-organised as an all volunteer force called the "Militia". Later, as the Australian military was hastily expanded on the eve of World War II, the 20th/54th Battalion was delinked and the 54th Battalion raised in its own right. This occurred on 1 September 1939.

During World War II, the battalion was mobilised for full-time service as part of the 5th Brigade of the 2nd Division. Initially, due to the provisions of the Defence Act, it was precluded from being sent overseas to fight, but in 1943 it was gazetted as an AIF unit. This meant that it could be sent outside the South West Pacific Area; regardless, the battalion remained in Australia and undertook garrison duties in New South Wales and Western Australia to defend against a possible invasion. The invasion never came and, on 9 January 1944, the battalion was disbanded, as part of a partial demobilisation of the Australian military that took place at that time as manpower was redirected back towards industry.

== Battle honours ==
The 54th Battalion received the following battle honours:

- World War I: Somme 1916–18, Bullecourt, Ypres 1917, Menin Road, Polygon Wood, Poelcappelle, Passchendaele, Ancre 1918, Villers-Bretonneux, Amiens, Albert 1918, Hindenburg Line, St. Quentin Canal, France and Flanders 1916–18, and Egypt 1916.

== Notes ==
Citations
