= Arthur Hall (soldier) =

Australian recipient of the Victoria Cross (1896–1978)

Arthur Hall VC
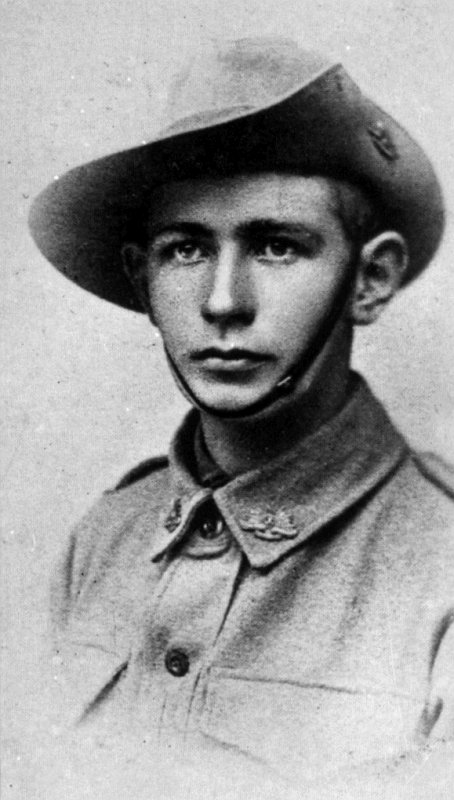
- Hall in c. 1918
- Born: 11 August 1896; Granville, New South Wales
- Died: 25 February 1978 (aged 81); Nyngan, New South Wales
- Military career
- Allegiance: Australia
- Branch: Australian Army
- Service years: 1916–1919; 1942–1943
- Rank: Lieutenant
- Units: 54th Battalion; 7th Garrison Battalion
- Conflicts: First World War; Western Front; Battle of Bullecourt; Battle of Passchendaele; Battle of Polygon Wood; Second Battle of Villers-Bretonneux; Battle of St. Quentin Canal; Second World War; Home Front
- Awards: Victoria Cross

Arthur Charles Hall, VC (11 August 1896 – 25 February 1978) was an Australian recipient of the Victoria Cross, the highest award for gallantry in the face of the enemy that can be awarded to British and Commonwealth forces. His Victoria Cross was won for his actions in September 1918 on the Western Front during the First World War.

== Early life ==
Hall was born on 11 August 1896 in the Sydney suburb of Granville, New South Wales, to a livestock farmer and his wife. After attending school in Bathurst, he worked with his father on properties near Nyngan.

== Military career ==
In April 1916, at the age of 19, Hall enlisted in the Australian Imperial Force (AIF). After training, he was posted to 54th Battalion, then serving on the Western Front in France. He was wounded in late March 1917, within two months of arriving in France. Back in the front lines by late April, he saw action during the Battle of Bullecourt and later, during the second phase of the Battle of Passchendaele, in the Battle of Polygon Wood. He was promoted to corporal after this latter battle.

The battalion was involved in fighting on the Somme from early to mid-1918, including the Second Battle of Villers-Bretonneux. It was then involved in the Hundred Days Offensive which began in August.

On 1 September 1918 at Péronne, Somme, Hall rushed a machine-gun post, shooting four of the enemy and capturing nine, with two guns. Continuously in advance of the main party, he personally led assault parties, capturing many small parties of the enemy and machine-guns. On the morning of 2 September during a heavy barrage, he carried to safety a comrade who had been dangerously wounded and was in urgent need of medical attention. It was for these actions that Hall was awarded the Victoria Cross.

After the Battle of St. Quentin Canal, Hall's battalion amalgamated with the 56th Battalion in October 1918, becoming the 54th/56th Battalion. He was promoted to sergeant with this unit before being discharged from the AIF in August 1919.

== Later life ==
After the war, Hall returned to the Nyngan district and purchased his own property, Gundooee station, for farming. He married in 1927.

During the Second World War, Hall served for a time as a lieutenant in a garrison unit but returned to farming sheep and cattle once his service was no longer required. Active in community affairs, he died in the district hospital on 25 February 1978, survived by his wife and four children Helen, George, Dennis and Charles. He is buried at St Matthew's Church in West Bogan, while his Victoria Cross is displayed at the Australian War Memorial, in Canberra.
