= 56th Battalion (Australia) =

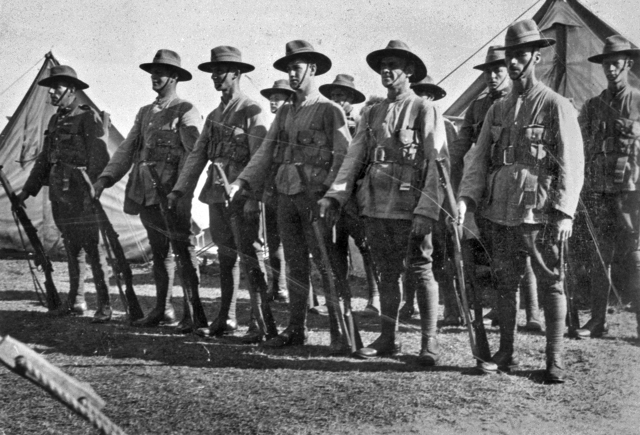
- Soldiers of the 56th Battalion in 1937
- Active: 1916–1919; 1921–1944; 1956–1957
- Country: Australia
- Branch: Army
- Type: Infantry
- Size: ~900–1,000 officers and men (Note: During World War I, the approved establishment of an Australian infantry battalion was 1,023 men. By the beginning of World War II, the normal size of an Australian infantry battalion had fallen to 910 men all ranks. Later still, following the reorganisation of the 3rd Division along the jungle establishment, the size dropped to 803 men all ranks.)
- Part of: 14th Brigade, 5th Division (WWI); 5th Brigade, 2nd Division (WWII)
- Engagements: World War I: Western Front; World War II

Insignia
- Unit colour patch

The 56th Battalion was an infantry battalion of the Australian Army. It was originally raised in 1916 for service during the World War I and took part in the fighting in the trenches of the Western Front in France and Belgium before being amalgamated with the 54th Battalion in late 1918 following the German spring offensive reduced the numbers in both battalions. After the war, the battalion was re-raised as a part-time unit in New South Wales. During World War II the battalion was mobilised and undertook garrison duties in Australia until it was disbanded in 1944. It was briefly re-raised in 1956, but was disbanded the following year and its personnel used to re-raise the 4th Battalion, which later became part of the Royal New South Wales Regiment.

== History ==
=== World War I ===
The 56th Battalion was originally formed on 14 February 1916 during the reorganisation and expansion of the First Australian Imperial Force (AIF) that took place in Egypt following the Gallipoli campaign. This was achieved by transferring cadres of experienced personnel predominately from the 1st Division to the newly formed battalions and combining them with recently recruited personnel who had been dispatched as reinforcements from Australia. With an authorised strength of 1,023 men, the unit's first intake of personnel were drawn from men originating from New South Wales, many of whom had already served with the 4th Battalion. Under the command of Lieutenant Colonel Allan Humphrey Scott, the battalion formed part of the 14th Brigade attached to the 5th Australian Division.

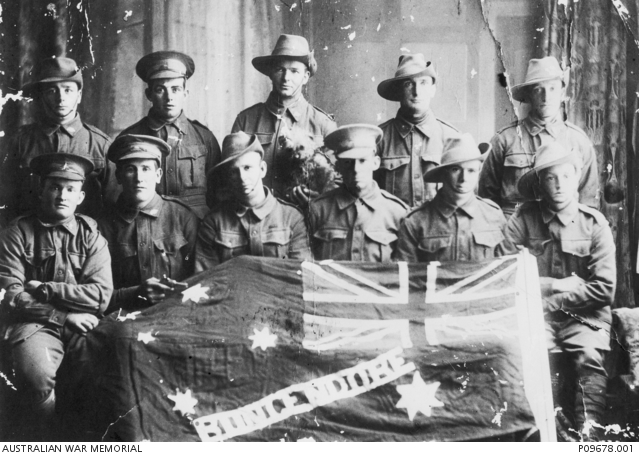
55th and 56th Battalion recruits from Bungendore, New South Wales, 1916.

After a period of training in Egypt, the AIF's infantry divisions were transferred to Europe to fight on the Western Front. Arriving in Marseille on 30 June 1916, the 56th Battalion was transported to northern France and within a fortnight was committed to the Battle of Fromelles, where the 5th Division undertook a disastrous attack that was later described as "the worst 24 hours in Australia's entire history". The 56th, along with the rest of the division, suffered heavy casualties, but was not withdrawn from the line until two months later. After enduring the coldest winter in 40 years in the Somme, during early 1917 the battalion took part in the brief advance the Allies enjoyed as the Germans withdrew to the Hindenburg Line, before undertaking a defensive role during the Second Battle of Bullecourt, and then launching an attack at Polygon Wood in September.

In early 1918, after wintering in Belgium, it was transferred south to France to assist in repulsing the major offensive the Germans launched on the Western Front following the capitulation of Tsarist Russia. Along with the rest of the 5th Division, the battalion defended the Allied line around Corbie, holding a position north of Villers-Bretonneux. After the German offensive lost momentum, in August, around Amiens, the Allies launched the Hundred Days Offensive, which ultimately brought about an end to the war. The 14th Brigade remained in reserve initially, before capturing Peronne in early September. During late September and early October the 56th took part in the Battle of St. Quentin Canal, before it was withdrawn from the line. Having suffered heavy casualties during the fighting earlier in the year, the Australian Corps was re-organised and the 56th Battalion was amalgamated with the 54th Battalion on 11 October forming the 54th/56th Battalion. This unit did not see any further action before the war ended in November and together they were later amalgamated with the rest of the 14th Brigade, with the 56th Battalion being disbanded on 10 April 1919.

During the fighting, the 56th Battalion lost 529 men killed in action or died on active service and 1,630 wounded. Members of the battalion received the following decorations: two Distinguished Service Orders (DSO), one Member of the Order of the British Empire (MBE), 21 Military Crosses (MCs) with one Bar, 20 Distinguished Conduct Medals (DCMs), 50 Military Medals (MMs), nine Meritorious Service Medals (MSMs), 25 Mentions in Despatches (MIDs) and eight foreign awards. The battalion received a total of 16 battle honours for its involvement in the war in 1927.

=== Inter-war years and subsequent service ===
In 1921, following the demobilisation of the AIF, Australia's part-time military force, the Citizen Force, was reorganised to duplicate the divisional structure of the AIF, reviving its numerical designations. As a result, the 56th Battalion was re-formed in the state of New South Wales, as part of the 14th Brigade, within the 2nd Military District. Upon formation, the battalion drew personnel from two previously existing units, the 2nd Battalion, 56th Infantry Regiment and the 5th Battalion, 3rd Infantry Regiment. In 1927, when territorial titles were adopted, the battalion became known as "The Riverina Regiment". It also received an official motto, that of Trutina Probatus at this time. In 1937, the battalion became allied to the Gloucestershire Regiment.

During World War II, the 56th Battalion undertook garrison duties in New South Wales and Western Australia, as part of the 5th Brigade of the 2nd Division. In 1943, the battalion was gazetted as an AIF unit after the majority of its personnel volunteered to serve outside of Australian territory, nevertheless, it did not serve overseas, and was disbanded on 9 June 1944. After the war, the battalion was not reformed until July 1956 when it was re-raised as the 56th Reconnaissance Battalion (Riverina Regiment). It was disbanded again in September 1957. Along with the 7th/21st Australian Horse it formed the basis of the reformed 4th Battalion, which was raised in 1958 and later became part of the Royal New South Wales Regiment.

== Alliances ==
The 56th Battalion held the following alliances:

- United Kingdom – Gloucestershire Regiment: 1937–51.

== Battle honours ==
The 56th Battalion was awarded the following battle honours:

- World War I: Somme 1916–18, Bullecourt, Ypres 1917, Menin Road, Polygon Wood, Poelcappelle, Passchendaele, Ancre 1918, Villers-Bretonneux, Amiens, Albert 1918, Hindenburg Line, St. Quentin Canal, France and Flanders 1916–18, Egypt 1916.

== Notes ==
Footnotes

Citations
