= John Ryan (Australian soldier) =

Recipient of the Victoria Cross, born 1890

John Ryan VC
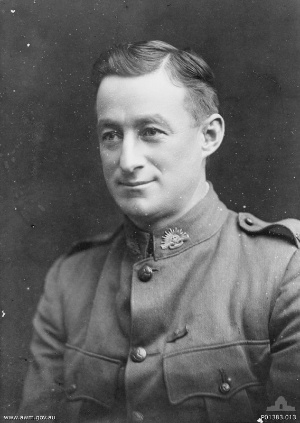
- Private Edward John Francis Ryan VC c. 1919
- Born: Edward John Francis Ryan; 9 February 1890; Tumut, New South Wales
- Died: 3 June 1941 (aged 51); Royal Melbourne Hospital, Victoria
- Military career
- Allegiance: Australia
- Branch: Australian Imperial Force
- Service years: 1915–20
- Rank: Private
- Units: 55th Battalion
- Conflicts: First World War; Hindenburg Defences
- Awards: Victoria Cross

Edward John Francis Ryan, VC (9 February 1890 – 3 June 1941) was an Australian recipient of the Victoria Cross, the highest award for gallantry in the face of the enemy that can be awarded to British and Commonwealth forces.

He was approximately 28 years old, and a private in the 55th Battalion, Australian Imperial Force during the First World War when the following deed took place for which he was awarded the VC.

On 30 September 1918 at the Hindenburg Defences, France, when the enemy succeeded in establishing a bombing party in the rear of the battalion's recently won position, Private Ryan, on his own initiative, organized and led a party of men with bombs and bayonets against the enemy. He reached the position with only three men and they succeeded in driving the enemy back. Private Ryan cleared the last of them alone, finally falling wounded himself.

After the war, Ryan struggled to adjust to civilian life. During the Great Depression Ryan was an itinerant worker. In 1935, he walked to Mildura where he was given work by the local council. He later worked for an insurance company in Melbourne. By 1941, Ryan was again destitute and working as an itinerant labourer. In June that year he was diagnosed with pneumonia and admitted to Royal Melbourne Hospital, where he died. He was buried in the Catholic section of Springvale Cemetery with an honour guard of eight Victoria Cross winners in attendance.

His Victoria Cross was displayed at the Australian War Memorial (Canberra, Australia).
