= 55th Battalion (Australia) =

Australian Army infantry battalion

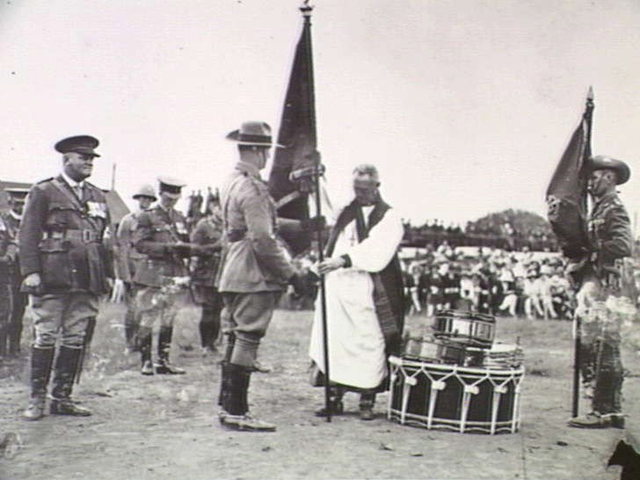
- The 55th Battalion receives its Colours in a ceremony at Liverpool, NSW, in 1927
- Active: 1916–1919; 1921–1937; 1941–1942
- Country: Australia
- Branch: Australian Army
- Type: Infantry
- Size: ~800–1,000 men (Note: During World War I, the authorised strength of an Australian infantry battalion was 1,023 men. By the start of World War II, it was 910 men all ranks, however, later in the war it fell to 803.)
- Part of: 14th Brigade, 5th Division; 14th Brigade, 2nd Division
- Nickname: New South Wales Rifle Regiment
- Colours: Brown beside green
- Engagements: World War I: Western Front; World War II: New Guinea campaign

Insignia
- Unit colour patch

The 55th Battalion was an infantry battalion of the Australian Army. Raised in 1916 for service during World War I in the AIF the battalion served on the Western Front until the end of the war, before being briefly amalgamated with the 53rd Battalion and then being disbanded in 1919. In 1921, the 55th Battalion (militia) was re-raised and in 1927 adopted the title of the "New South Wales Irish Rifles". This designation was later changed to the "New South Wales Rifle Regiment" in 1930, before they were once again amalgamated with the 53rd, forming the 55th/53rd Battalion (New South Wales Rifle/West Sydney Regiment) in 1937. In October 1941, during World War II, the two militia battalions were delinked and the 55th was later deployed to New Guinea, where they took part in the Kokoda Track campaign, fighting against the Japanese. Poorly prepared and trained, and lacking up to date equipment, they performed above expectations; however, they were amalgamated with the 53rd, which had not fared so well, once more in October 1942. The 55th/53rd (now part of the AIF) subsequently took part in further campaigns in New Guinea and Bougainville before being disbanded in May 1946.

== History ==
=== World War I ===
The 55th Battalion was initially raised during World War I in February 1916 as part of the expansion of the Australian Imperial Force (AIF) that was undertaken in Egypt after the end of the Gallipoli campaign. At this time the size of the AIF was doubled by forming new battalions from reinforcements from Australia and experienced personnel drawn from units that had served at Gallipoli. Assigned to the 14th Brigade, which was part of the 5th Division, the battalion drew its cadre staff from the 3rd Battalion. During the first half of 1916, the battalion undertook defensive duties around the Suez Canal.

In June 1916, the battalion was transferred to the European theatre along with the other battalions of the four Australian infantry divisions that were in the Middle East at that time and they arrived in France at the end of the month. Following this, the 55th Battalion took its place in the trenches along the Western Front in mid-July, amidst heavy fighting on the Somme. The battalion did not have to wait long before they experienced their first engagement of the campaign, being committed to the Battle of Fromelles a week later on 19 July. Initially they were placed in reserve, but as the attack stalled, the 55th Battalion was tasked with providing the rearguard for the withdrawal of the assault formations. After spending the winter in the trenches on the Somme, in 1917 they took part in the advance to the Hindenburg Line that followed the German withdrawal that had been affected as part of a German plan to shorten their lines and free up reserves. The battalion then played a defensive role in the Second Battle of Bullecourt before moving to Ypres in Belgium where they took part in the Battle of Polygon Wood on 26 September 1917.

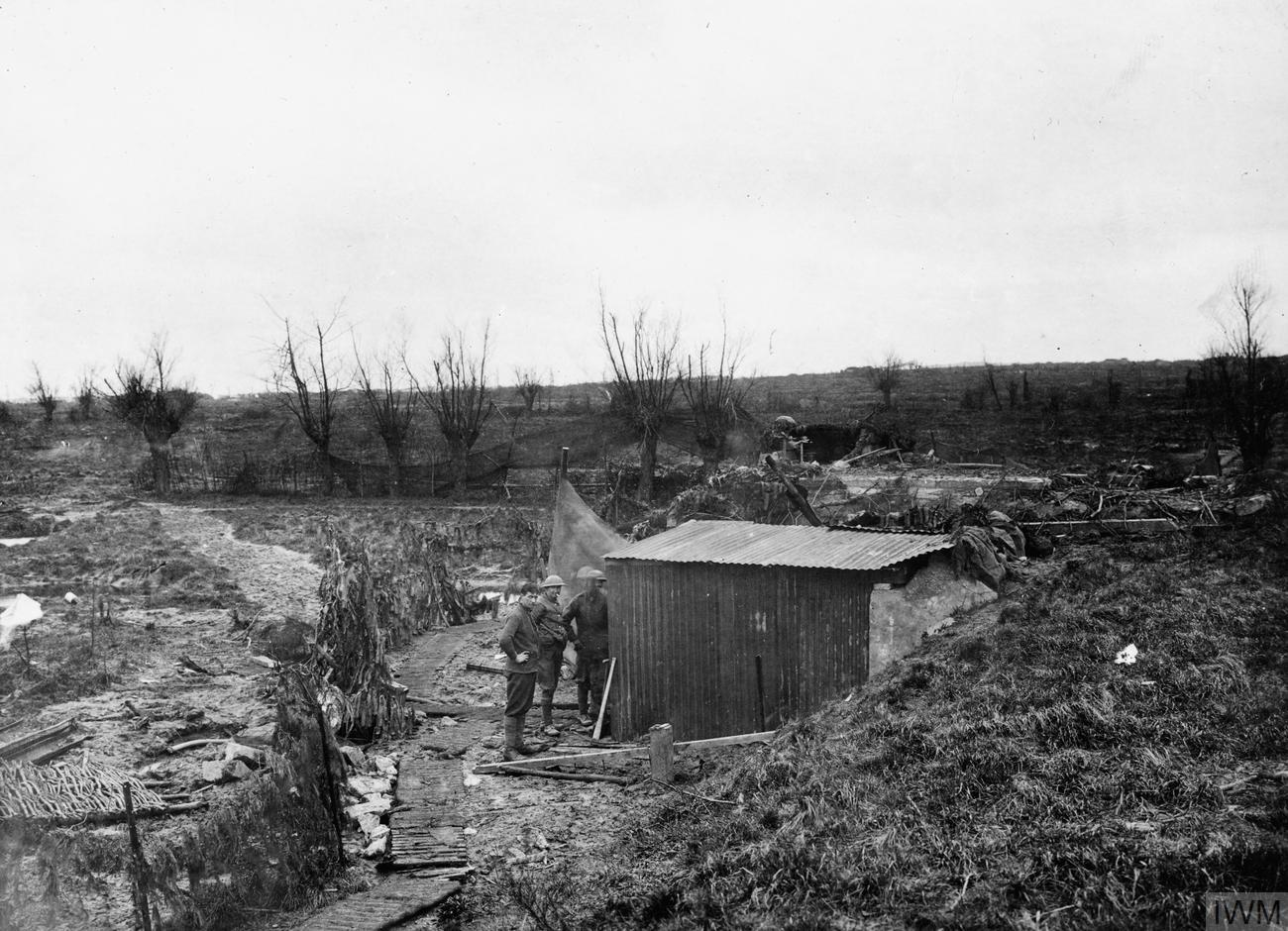
The 55th Battalion's line at Wytschaete, near Messines, in February 1918

In early 1918, the Germans launched a major offensive – the Spring Offensive – after the capitulation of Russia freed up a large number of divisions, allowing them to concentrate their forces on the Western Front. The initial attack fell on the British sector of the line around the Somme, and as the Allies were steadily pushed back towards Amiens, the Australian divisions were moved south from Messines to help shore up the line. The 55th Battalion manned defensive positions to the north Villers-Bretonneux, holding their positions even though the town fell into German hands. When the Allied Hundred Days Offensive began in August, the 55th Battalion was not initially involved although close to the end of the month it, along with the rest of the 14th Brigade, were committed to the fighting around Péronne during the Battle of Mont Saint-Quentin. The battalion's final involvement in the fighting came late in September when they took part in the Battle of St. Quentin Canal, which resulted in Private John Ryan being awarded the Victoria Cross (VC).

Following this, the 55th Battalion was withdrawn from the line along with the rest of the Australian Corps and was still in the process of re-organisation when the Armistice came into effect. Shortly afterwards the process of demobilisation began and slowly men were repatriated back to Australia. As numbers dwindled, the battalion was merged with the 53rd Battalion in March 1919, and a month later, on 11 April 1919, the amalgamated 55th/53rd Battalion was also disbanded. During its active service, the 55th Battalion suffered 1,835 casualties of which 507 were killed. The decorations bestowed upon men from the 55th were: one VC, one Distinguished Service Order; one Member of the Order of the British Empire; 24 Military Crosses with two Bars; 22 Distinguished Conduct Medals with one Bar; 72 Military Medals with one first Bar, one second Bar and one third Bar; three Meritorious Service Medals and 24 Mentions in Despatches. (Note: In addition to this, there were four foreign awards bestowed, although the sources do not elaborate as to what these were.) The instance of the third Bar to the MM is unique, and was bestowed upon one of the 55th Battalion's stretcher bearers, Private Ernest Albert Corey.

=== Inter-war years ===
The AIF was officially disbanded in April 1921 and the following month the units of the part-time Citizens Force were reorganised to perpetuate the numerical designations and battle honours of the AIF units that had fought during the war. At this time the 55th Battalion was re-raised around Sydney, with headquarters at Forest Lodge, drawing personnel mainly from the 2nd Battalion, 55th Infantry Regiment, but also from parts of the 1st, 4th, and 36th Infantry Regiments. Through its link with the 55th Infantry, the battalion inherited a theatre honour from the Second Boer War: "South Africa 1899–1902", which it bore for the 8th Regiment, New South Wales Infantry. In 1927, when territorial designations were adopted, it became the "New South Wales Irish Rifles"; the battalion's motto, Faugh-a-Ballagh was approved at this time too. This name was changed in 1930 to the "New South Wales Rifle Regiment", perpetuating the name of a volunteer unit which had originally been formed in 1854. In 1928, a feature film was released which had been made by two members of the battalion, The Spirit of Gallipoli, promoting the role of the army in peacetime.

In 1929, after newly elected Scullin Labor government decided to suspend the compulsory training scheme and replace it with a voluntary system. At the same time the Citizens Force was renamed the "Militia" in order to illustrate the new nature of military service under this scheme. This decision, as well as the impact of the Great Depression had a disastrous effect on the manning levels of the Militia as few men were able to commit to time off work for training and as a result the decision was made to amalgamate a number of units. The 55th Battalion managed to avoid this fate until 1937, however, when they were amalgamated with the 53rd Battalion, forming the 55th/53rd Battalion (New South Wales Rifle/West Sydney Regiment). This reformed a partnership that had begun at the end of the previous war and which would continue into the next. The battalion's motto was changed to Animo et Fide in 1937.

=== World War II ===
At the outset of the World War II, due to the provisions of the Defence Act (1903) which prohibited sending the Militia to fight outside of Australian territory, the decision was made to raise an all volunteer force, the Second Australian Imperial Force (2nd AIF), for service overseas. (Note: This stipulation also applied to the 2,800-strong Permanent Military Force. Nevertheless, as the war progressed, 32 Militia battalions were employed on active service during the war, all but three of which were granted AIF status. Essentially this meant that as more than 65 per cent of their wartime establishment had volunteered for service overseas, the battalion could be sent anywhere, including outside of Australian territory.) As a result of this, the Militia units that already existed were used to provide a cadre of trained personnel upon which to raise the units of the 2nd AIF, as well as to administer the training of conscripts that were called up following the reinstitution of the compulsory training scheme in January 1940. They were also called up progressively to undertake brief periods of continuous service to improve overall military preparedness.

In October 1941, as tensions in the Pacific grew, the 55th/53rd Battalion, as part of the 14th Brigade, was undertaking a period of continuous training at Bathurst, New South Wales, when it was announced that they were to be delinked once more. The following month the 55th Battalion was re-raised in its own right and after moving to Greta Camp it received fresh drafts of reinforcements and was subsequently brought up to its allocated establishment. In December, following the Japanese attacks on Pearl Harbor and Malaya, the 55th Battalion was transported to Newcastle, New South Wales, where they set up defences along the coast in the Raymond Terrace–Stockton Beach area.

The following year, as the strategic outlook deteriorated following the fall of Singapore, the battalion was warned to prepare to move and over the course of a week between 22 and 29 May 1942 they were transported to Port Moresby in New Guinea. At this time they were separated from their parent formation, the 14th Brigade, which had remained in Australia and upon their arrival they were used mainly as a labour force and were given little time to train for combat operations. In July, the battalion was split as 'A', 'C' and a section from 'E' Company were sent to Milne Bay for a month. Upon their return many of the men were found to be suffering from malaria and other tropical diseases, nevertheless in September the battalion was ordered to move to Owers' Corner along the Kokoda Track and to begin patrolling operations along Goldie River Valley in order to deny it as an avenue of approach to the Japanese. Throughout the month the 55th moved into position. The battalion's machine gun company was established at Ilolo, while one of the rifle companies, 'D' Company, set up astride the track at Uberi.

In early October 1942, the battalion was inspected by a number of high-ranking officers, including Generals Douglas MacArthur and Thomas Blamey, Major General Arthur Allen and the Australian Minister for the Army, Frank Forde. Following this the battalion received orders to return to Port Moresby and continue the task of building defences around Sapphire Creek. Instances of sickness and disease had depleted the battalion, nevertheless when they were inspected by Blamey on 25 October he praised them for their performance and the 14th Brigade's commander, Colonel Ian Fullarton, sent the battalion's commanding officer his congratulations on having performed above expectations despite the circumstances in which they had been sent to New Guinea. Nevertheless, on 27 October 1942 it was announced that the battalion was to be amalgamated once again with the 53rd Battalion, which was being broken up as following its less than successful involvement in the fighting along the Kokoda Track. Around this time, the battalion's machine gun company was detached and in conjunction with several other Militia machine gun companies, it was used to form the 7th Machine Gun Battalion.

After they were linked once more, and the 55th/53rd Battalion went on to serve with success around Sanananda and then later in the Bougainville campaign in 1944–1945. During the 55th's brief involvement in the war, it lost three men killed or died on active service, while a further four men were wounded. There were no gallantry or distinguished service decorations bestowed upon members of the battalion at this time.

== Battle honours ==
The 55th Battalion received the following battle and theatre honours:

- Boer War: South Africa 1899–1902 (inherited).
- World War I: Somme 1916–18, Bullecourt, Ypres 1917, Menin Road, Polygon Wood, Poelcappelle, Passchendaele, Ancre 1918, Villers-Bretonneux, Amiens, Albert 1918, Mont St Quentin, Hindenburg Line, St Quentin Canal, St Quentin Canal, France and Flanders 1916–18, Egypt 1915–16.
- World War II: South-West Pacific 1942–45, Buna–Gona, Sanananda Road, Liberation of Australian New Guinea.

== Notes ==
Footnotes

Citations
