= 4th Battalion (Australia) =

4th Battalion, AIF 4th Battalion (Australian Rifles) 4th Battalion, Royal New South Wales Regiment
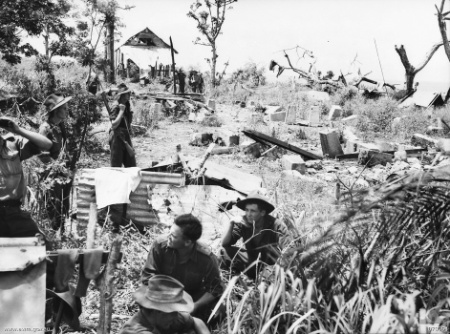
- Battalion headquarters, Sio, New Guinea, January 1944
- Active: 1914–1919; 1921–1930; 1937–1946; 1957–1960; 1965–1987
- Country: Australia
- Branch: Australian Army
- Type: Infantry
- Size: ~800–1,000 officers and men
- Part of: 1st Brigade, 1st Division (First World War); 8th Brigade, 5th Division (Second World War)
- Motto: Nomine Quartus
- Colours: White over green
- Engagements: First World War: Gallipoli campaign; Western Front; Second World War: Huon Peninsula campaign; Aitape–Wewak campaign

Commanders
- Notable commanders: Iven Giffard Mackay

Insignia
- Unit colour patch
- Abbreviation: 4 RNSWR

The 4th Battalion was an infantry battalion of the Australian Army. Originally raised as part of the First Australian Imperial Force during the First World War, the battalion formed part of the 1st Brigade, attached to the 1st Division. During the war the battalion fought at Gallipoli and in the trenches on the Western Front, before being disbanded in 1919. In 1921, the battalion was re-raised as a militia unit and designated as the "4th Battalion (Australian Rifles)", adopting the designation of the Australian Rifles militia unit from which many of the battalion's recruits had come during the war. In 1930, the battalion was amalgamated with the 3rd Battalion (Werriwa Regiment) and they remained linked until 1936, when they were delinked.

During the Second World War, the 4th Battalion formed part of the 8th Brigade. Initially the battalion was used as garrison troops in Australia, serving in Western Australia, in early 1944 they were deployed to New Guinea as part of the 5th Division, where they participated in the Huon Peninsula and Aitape–Wewak campaigns, before returning to Australia in early 1946 and were subsequently disbanded.

In 1957, the battalion was re-raised as part of the Citizens Military Force, perpetuating the battle honours of the previously existing units that had fought during the First and Second World Wars. In 1960, with the introduction of the Pentropic organisation into the Australian Army and the subsequent formation of the Royal New South Wales Regiment the battalion was absorbed into the 3rd Battalion, Royal New South Wales Regiment, forming that unit's 'D' and 'E' Companies. In 1965, the battalion was reformed as the "4th Battalion, Royal New South Wales Regiment" and it remained in existence until 1987 when it was once again amalgamated with the 3rd Battalion to form the 4th/3rd Battalion, Royal New South Wales Regiment, a unit which remains in existence today.

== Lineage ==
Like many Australian infantry units, the 4th Battalion has a convoluted lineage and can trace its origins back to two separate units of the New South Wales colonial forces. The first of these units is the Newtown Volunteer Rifle Regiment which was formed in 1862, while the second is the Ashfield Volunteer Reserve Corps, which was raised in 1885. In 1914, these units—which had evolved through a series of reorganisations and redesignations into the 29th Infantry (Australian Rifles) and the 37th and 38th Infantry Regiments—were the basis upon which the 4th Battalion, AIF, was raised, although these units continued to exist throughout the war. In 1918, these units were redesignated as the 2nd Battalion, 36th Infantry Regiment, and the 5th Battalion, 18th Infantry Regiment.

In 1919, the 4th Battalion, AIF, was disbanded and in 1921 the two militia units were amalgamated and re-raised as the 4th Battalion (Australian Rifles), perpetuating the battle honours of the AIF unit. After that the battalion existed as a distinct entity (except for a period in the 1930s when it was amalgamated with the 3rd Battalion) up until 1946 when it was disbanded. Following the war the unit was not re-raised until 1957, however, when it was raised from the 7th/21st Australian Horse Regiment and the 56th Battalion (Riverina Regiment), which had been formed in 1948 and 1956 respectively as part of the Citizens Military Force, and thus further confusing the unit's lineage. The battalion also inherited the battle honours of the 2/4th Battalion, which had been raised from volunteers for overseas service from the 4th Battalion during the Second World War. Between 1960 and 1965, the battalion was subsumed into the 3rd Battalion, Royal New South Wales Regiment, a Pentropic battalion that is distinct to the 3rd Battalion itself, before being re-raised in its own right in 1965 as the 4th Battalion, Royal New South Wales Regiment.

== History ==
=== First World War ===
Because of the provisions of the Defence Act 1903, which precluded sending conscripts overseas to fight, following the outbreak of the war the decision was made to raise an all volunteer force outside of the existing militia units that already existed. This force was known as the Australian Imperial Force (AIF) and it was used to fight overseas in Europe and the Middle East, while the militia remained in Australia on home service. Nevertheless, many members of the militia joined the AIF and were allocated to AIF units on a territorial basis. As a result, many of the AIF battalions adopted the identities of their associated militia units. The 4th Battalion was raised in New South Wales within two weeks of the start of the war, with many of its recruits being drawn from the 29th Infantry Regiment (Australian Rifles) and the 37th and 38th Infantry Regiments. The majority of these personnel came from inner Sydney, although the battalion also drew men from Albury, Cootamundra, Goulburn and Wagga Wagga.

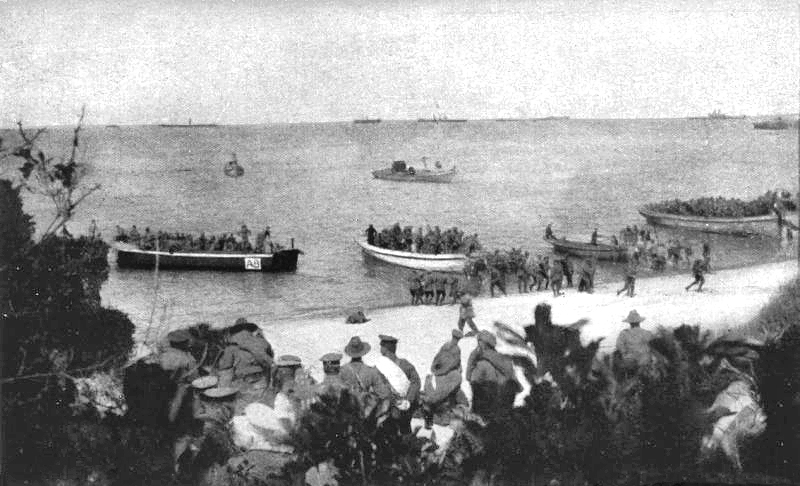
Members of the 4th Battalion landing at Gallipoli

Initially, the battalion concentrated at Randwick, Sydney, forming the 1st Brigade along with the 1st, 2nd and 3rd Battalions. After only two months training the battalion was among the first Australian units to be deployed overseas, arriving in Egypt on 2 December 1914. After this the battalion undertook further training and took part in the defence of the Suez Canal before taking part in the Landing at Anzac Cove on 25 April 1915 as part of the second and third waves. The following day, its commanding officer, Lieutenant Colonel Astley Thompson, who had only just taken over from the adjutant Captain Iven Mackay who had been commanding the battalion temporarily in Thompson's absence, was killed in action. In August, the battalion took part in the attack on Lone Pine after which they were involved in the defensive stalemate that ensued until they were evacuated from the peninsula along with the rest of the force in December 1915.

After the withdrawal from Gallipoli, the battalion returned to Egypt where the AIF underwent a period of expansion and reorganisation. In March 1916, the 4th Battalion, along with the rest of the 1st Division, was transferred to the European theatre of operations where for the next two and a half years the battalion served in the trenches along the Western Front in France and Belgium. The battalion's first major action in France was at Pozières in July 1916. Later the battalion fought at Ypres, in Belgium, before returning to the Somme in winter, where they were used in a mainly defensive role. In 1918 the battalion helped to stop the German spring offensive in March and April. From 14–26 March Alick Bryant, who is believed to have been the youngest Australian soldier to serve during the war, was posted to the battalion while it fought in the Somme Valley. The battalion subsequently participated in the final Allied offensive of the war—the Hundred Days Offensive—which was launched near Amiens on 8 August 1918. The battalion continued operations to late September 1918, when the Australian Corps was withdrawn from the line for rest and reorganisation. The battalion was still out of the line when the Armistice was declared on 11 November 1918.

Following the end of hostilities the battalion returned to Australia between November 1918 and May 1919 for demobilisation and discharge. During the war, the battalion suffered 3,485 casualties, of which 1,203 were killed. Members of the battalion received the following decorations: two Companions of the Order of St Michael and St George, five Distinguished Service Orders with one Bar, 28 Military Crosses with one Bar, 20 Distinguished Conduct Medals with one Bar, 125 Military Medals with four Bars, seven Meritorious Service Medals, 68 Mentions in Despatches, and seven foreign awards.

=== Inter-war years ===
During the war while the units of the AIF had been deployed overseas, the militia had remained in Australia on home service, during which they were called up to provide service at installations considered vital to the war effort such as ports, military bases and ammunition factories, as well as manning coastal defences. Over the course of the war, although there was some attempt to limit the numbers of militiamen joining the AIF, especially in the trades considered vital to national defence such as garrison artillery and engineers, large numbers of the militia volunteered for service with the AIF during the war, to the extent that many militia units ceased to exist in as effective units. As a result, during the war the compulsory training scheme was temporarily suspended in September 1915 and it was not until late in the war that it began again in ernest.

Following the recommencement of the compulsory training scheme in 1918 there was a reorganisation of the militia in Australia. As a result of this a number of changes were made, including the designations of many of the infantry regiments of the militia which were expanded to become multi-battalion regiments and were redesignated. As a part of these changes the 29th Infantry Regiment (Australian Rifles) was redesignated as the 2nd Battalion, 36th Infantry Regiment, while the 40th Infantry Regiment (which had been formed in 1915 from the 37th and 38th Infantry Regiments) was redesignated as the 5th Battalion, 18th Infantry Regiment. By mid-1919 most of the AIF battalions had been disbanded, however, it was not until 1 April 1921 that the AIF itself was officially disbanded. In May 1921 the militia was reorganised once more, and the previously existing militia units were redesignated in order to preserve the battle honours and identities of their associated AIF units. As a result of this decision and due to the links that the 4th Battalion, AIF, had with the 2nd Battalion, 36th Infantry Regiment and the 5th Battalion, 18th Infantry Regiment, these two militia units were amalgamated and redesignated as the 4th Battalion. In 1927 the battalion readopted its territorial designation, becoming the 4th Battalion (Australian Rifles).

In 1929, following the election of the Scullin Labor government, the compulsory training scheme was suspended once again and it was decided that the militia would be maintained on a voluntary, part-time basis only. Coupled with the economic hardships of the time due to the Great Depression and the general lack of importance placed upon defence matters at the time by the government and the public, the militia's numbers fell and a number of units were amalgamated. The 4th Battalion was one of these units, being amalgamated with the 3rd Battalion (Werriwa Regiment) in 1930, beginning an association that continues today. In 1937, the battalion was delinked and became a separate unit once more.

=== Second World War ===
As had happened during the First World War, when the Second World War began the Australian government decided to raise an all volunteer force for overseas service. This force was known as the Second Australian Imperial Force (2nd AIF). From the outset it was decided to raise this force with little impact upon the militia, as it was felt that there was a need to build up the defences in Australia due to concerns that Britain might not be able to fulfill its pledge to defend Singapore if the Japanese were to attack. As a result, initially there was a cap placed on the number of militiamen that were allowed to join the 2nd AIF. Nevertheless, large numbers of militiamen did volunteer for service and in an effort to preserve the territorial identity of the militia units, many men from the 4th Battalion were allocated to the 2/4th Battalion, AIF, which was raised at Ingleburn, New South Wales, in October 1939.

In January 1940, the compulsory training scheme which had been suspended since 1929 was reintroduced and militia units were progressively called up for three month periods of full-time service in order to improve their readiness in case they were to be called upon to fight. The 4th Battalion (Australian Rifles) was mobilised in early 1942 following Japan's entry into the war and in June 1942 they concentrated at Greta, New South Wales, forming the 8th Brigade along with the 30th and 35th Battalions. A month later the brigade was moved to Western Australia where they remained for the next two years, carrying out various garrison duties such as training, building and manning defensive positions and providing a labour force. During this time it was stationed at various locations along the coast between Bunbury and Geraldton and formed part of the 2nd Division.

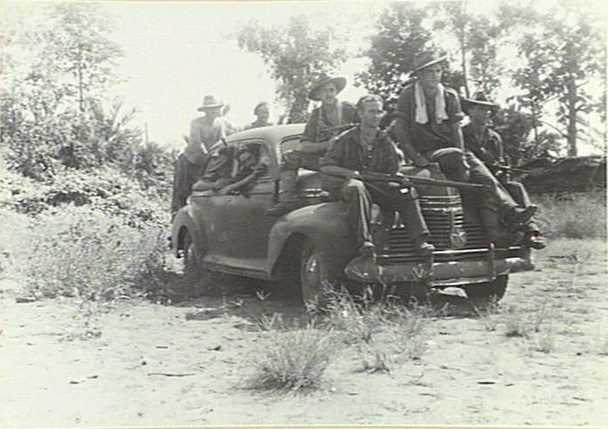
Troops from the 4th Battalion using a captured Japanese staff car on patrol, Hansa Bay, June 1944.

At the end of 1943 the 8th Brigade was moved to North Queensland and in January 1944, it was reallocated to the 5th Division and deployed to New Guinea. The 4th Battalion was the first unit from the brigade to arrive and after relieving the 2/17th Battalion at Sio it began the task of clearing the coast between there at Saidor, in order to support the 9th Division's campaign on the Huon Peninsula. In early February, they had completed this objective and were relieved by the 30th Battalion at Crossingtown. As the campaign progressed the 8th Brigade was tasked with clearing the Madang–Bagadjim area and the 4th Battalion carried out patrols between the Maclay River and Bostrem Bay. In May, the brigade went on the offensive against the Japanese forces located to the north of Alexishafen in order to support the 6th Division's campaign in the Aitape–Wewak region. In mid June, the 4th Battalion took over the advance and occupied Bogia, Potsdam and Hansa Bay. In October, following the end of hostilities, they were moved to Wewak as the demobilisation process began. The last members of the battalion departed for Australia on 24 January 1946 and the battalion was subsequently disbanded. During the war the battalion suffered 39 casualties, of which 15 were killed. Members of the battalion received the following decorations: two Military Medals and six Mentions in Despatches.

=== Post Second World War ===
In 1948, the militia was re-raised under the guise of the Citizens Military Force (CMF), however, the 4th Battalion was not re-raised until 1957 when it was formed in the Riverina District of New South Wales from the 7th/21st Australian Horse and the 56th Battalion (Riverina Regiment). The national service scheme had been reintroduced in 1951; however, it was suspended once more in 1960. At the same the Australian Army was reorganised with the introduction of the Pentropic divisional structure and the old regional militia units subsumed into six State-based regiments. As a result, the CMF was greatly reduced in size and many infantry units were absorbed into the new battalions that were organised according to the Pentropic establishment. (Note: As a result of the reduced manpower and reorganisation the number of infantry battalions fell from 31 to 17.) The 4th Battalion was subsumed into the 3rd Battalion, Royal New South Wales Regiment, forming two companies—'D' Company (Australian Rifles) and 'E' Company (Riverina Company).

In 1965, the Pentropic system was discontinued and the CMF reorganised again. As a result of this reorganisation the existing battalions were reduced in size and a number of new battalions were raised in more populous areas in New South Wales, Queensland and Victoria. As a result, the 4th Battalion was re-raised in its own right on 1 July 1965, becoming the 4th Battalion, Royal New South Wales Regiment (4 RNSWR). As 4 RNSWR the battalion remained on the order of battle until 1987 when a further reorganisation of the Australian Army Reserve saw it amalgamated with 3 RNSWR once again, forming 4/3 RNSWR, a unit that continues to exist as part of the 5th Brigade, attached to the 2nd Division.

== Battle honours ==
The 4th Battalion received the following battle honours:

- Second Boer War: South Africa 1900–02. (Note: The 4th Battalion inherited this battle honour from its predecessor units which contributed to the New South Wales Contingents that were sent to South Africa during the Second Boer War.)
- First World War: ANZAC, Landing at ANZAC, Defence at ANZAC, Suvla, Sari Bair–Lone Pine, Somme 1916, Somme 1918, Pozieres, Bullecourt, Ypres 1917, Menin Road, Polygon Wood, Broodseinde, Poelcappelle, Passchendaele, Lys, Hazebrouck, Amiens, Albert 1918 (Chuignes), Hindenburg Line, Hindenburg Line, Epehy, France and Flanders 1916–1918.
- Second World War: South-West Pacific 1944–45, Liberation of Australian New Guinea, North Africa, Bardia 1941, Capture of Tobruk, Greece 1941, Veve, Soter, Middle East 1941–1944, Crete, Heraklion, South-West Pacific 1942–1945, Liberation of Australian New Guinea, Wewak, Wirui Mission, Mount Shiburangu–Mount Tazaki. (Note: Battle honours for the Second World War include both the 4th Battalion and 2/4th Battalion, as the 4th Battalion inherited the 2/4th's battle honours upon being re-raised in 1957. The 4th Battalion earned two battle honours during the war, while the 2/4th earned 14, one of which the 4th also earned.)

== Notes ==
Footnotes

Citations
