= 1st Brigade (Australia) =

Formation of the Australian Army

- Active: 1903–present
- Country: Australia
- Branch: Australian Army
- Type: Combined arms
- Size: 3,500
- Part of: 1st (Australian) Division
- Garrison/HQ: Robertson Barracks, Darwin, Northern Territory
- Engagements: World War I: Gallipoli; Western Front; East Timor; Iraq; Afghanistan Solomon Islands

Commanders
- Current commander: Brigadier Douglas Pashley CSC
- Notable commanders: Henry MacLaurin; Alan Morrison; Michael Jeffery; John Sanderson; Frank Hickling; David Hurley; Ash Power; John Cantwell; Jim Molan; David Butler; Mick Ryan

Insignia
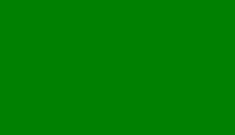
- Brigade Colour Patch

1st Brigade is a unit of the Australian Army that is tasked to operate in the littoral environment. Formed in 1903 as a militia formation based in New South Wales, it was reconstituted as part of the Australian Imperial Force in 1914 for service during World War I, the brigade fought at Gallipoli and on the Western Front before being disbanded in mid-1919. In 1921, the 1st Brigade was re-raised as a unit of Australia's part-time military forces, based in New South Wales. During World War II the brigade undertook defensive duties before being disbanded. In 1948, it was re-raised as an integral part of the Australian Regular Army. Currently the brigade is based at Robertson Barracks in Darwin and at RAAF Base Edinburgh near Adelaide, South Australia.

== History ==
=== Formation ===
Originally formed in 1903 as a Militia unit of the Commonwealth Military Forces, it was established in New South Wales and consisted of four battalion-sized units—1st, 2nd, 3rd and 4th Australian Infantry Regiments. In 1912, the compulsory training scheme was introduced and at this time, the brigade was reorganised as part of the 1st Military District, with constituent units were spread across various locations in Queensland including Townsville, Cairns, Charters Towers, Mackay, Rockhampton, Mount Morgan, Bundaberg, Maryborough, Gympie, and Brisbane.

=== World War I ===
The 1st Brigade was re-constituted in Sydney, shortly after the start of World War I in August 1914 for service overseas as part of the Australian Imperial Force (AIF). Upon formation it consisted of four infantry battalions—the 1st, 2nd, 3rd and 4th—however, later it received organic fire support when the 1st Australian Machine Gun Company (February 1916 to February 1918) and 1st Australian Trench Mortar Battery (from April 1916) were added to its order of battle. Assigned to the 1st Division, the brigade's first commanding officer was Colonel Henry MacLaurin.

During the war, the 1st Brigade took part in the fighting at Gallipoli between April and December 1915, before being evacuated to Egypt at the end of the campaign. There, it was brought back up to strength and in mid-1916 the brigade was transferred to Europe, where it took part in the fighting on the Western Front in France and Belgium between 1916 and 1918, before being disbanded in April 1919. Notable battles in which the brigade fought include: Lone Pine, Pozières, Bullecourt, Passchendaele, Hazebrouck, Amiens and the Hindenburg Line. Five soldiers from 1st Brigade units received the Victoria Cross, Australia's highest military decoration, for their actions during the war. These were: John Hamilton, George Howell, Thomas Kenny, Leonard Keysor and Alfred Shout.

=== Inter war years and World War II ===
In 1921, the Australian military part-time forces were re-organised to perpetuate the numerical designations and structures of the AIF. As a result, the 1st Brigade was re-raised as a part-time formation of the Citizens Forces based in Newcastle, New South Wales, and consisting of four infantry battalions: the 13th, 33rd, 35th and 41st Battalions.

Initially, the brigade was staffed through the compulsory training scheme, which meant that the brigade was able to maintain its numbers, however, in 1922, following the signing of the Washington Naval Treaty, Australia's security concerns were reduced. As a result, the Army's budget was halved and the scope of the compulsory training scheme was scaled back; with this the authorised strength of each infantry battalion was reduced to just 409 men of all ranks. In 1929, the compulsory training scheme was suspended by the newly elected Scullin Labor government and was replaced by a voluntary system, under the new name of the "Militia". This, coupled with the financial hardships of the Great Depression, meant that there were few volunteers available for service and many units had to be amalgamated or disbanded.

As a result, the 1st Brigade was reduced to just three infantry battalions. Upon the outbreak of World War II in September 1939, the 1st Brigade consisted of the 13th, 33rd and 41st Battalions. Initially, upon the commencement of hostilities it was decided to call up the Militia to undertake periods of continuous training to boost the nation's readiness for war, however, following Japan's entry into the war in December 1941, they were mobilised for defensive duties. Although some Militia units were committed to combat operations in New Guinea from 1942 onwards, the 1st Brigade remained in Australia for the duration of the war, headquartered around Parramatta, New South Wales, where it formed part of the 1st Division. Later the brigade became part of the Newcastle Covering Force and then the 10th Division. In 1942, the brigade moved to Sydney, and from 1943 it was reduced to meet operational manpower needs elsewhere. In September 1944, the brigade moved to Singleton, New South Wales, where the two of its three infantry battalions were disbanded. By the end of hostilities, it consisted of only one battalion—the 41st/2nd Battalion—as other units had been transferred, amalgamated or disbanded. Between May 1942 and August 1945 it was commanded by Brigadier Frederick Burrows.

=== Post World War II ===
Following the end of hostilities in August 1945, the existing structures were disbanded throughout 1945 and into 1946 and the Interim Army was raised. As a part of this, the 34th Brigade was raised for occupation duties in Japan. In 1948, with the establishment of the reformation of the Regular Army and the raising of the Australian Regiment (later known as the Royal Australian Regiment), the 34th Brigade was renamed the 1st Brigade following its return to Australia. During the Korean War, individual elements of the brigade were detached for combat in Korea, although they were subsequently placed under the command of other formations.

In 1960, the Australian Army adopted the Pentropic divisional establishment. This saw the adoption of the five battalion division and resulted in the disbandment of the old three battalion brigade formations. As a result, the 1st Brigade, including its headquarters, was disbanded. In late 1964, however, the decision was made to end the experiment with the Pentropic establishment, partly because of the difficulties it created with allied interoperability. Early the following year the brigade formations were re-established, although they were designated "task forces" instead of brigades.

In mid-1965 1 RAR, was sent to Vietnam as part of Australia's commitment to the ongoing conflict in that country. In early 1966, the decision to increase the Australian Army's presence in Vietnam from one infantry battalion to two was announced. To command this force, it was decided to form an Australian task force. Shortly after this, the 1st Task Force, consisting of the 5th Battalion, Royal Australian Regiment (5 RAR), undertook a readiness exercise around Gospers in New South Wales. Once this exercise was successfully completed, the 1st Task Force's headquarters was used to raise the 1st Australian Task Force and was dispatched to Vietnam, where it would remain until the end of the Australian involvement. In 1972, the task force returned to Australia and had units located at Holsworthy in New South Wales, Woodside in South Australia and at Puckapunyal in Victoria.

In 1982, the "brigade" designations were readopted. Brigadier John Sheldrick was in command of the brigade at the time and early the year the 1st Armoured Regiment was placed under the 1st Brigade's command as part of the Army's mechanisation trials. The new role of the 1st Brigade as a mechanised force was confirmed in 1983 and following this the capability was developed. This saw the 5th/7th Battalion, Royal Australian Regiment (5/7 RAR), re-equipped with armoured personnel carriers, which they began to receive in July 1983. During the 1980s, one of the brigade's other infantry battalions, the 3rd Battalion, Royal Australian Regiment, began developing the Australian Army's parachute capability, and by late 1983 it had become a specialised parachute infantry battalion. They were later transferred to the 3rd Brigade.

=== Recent years ===
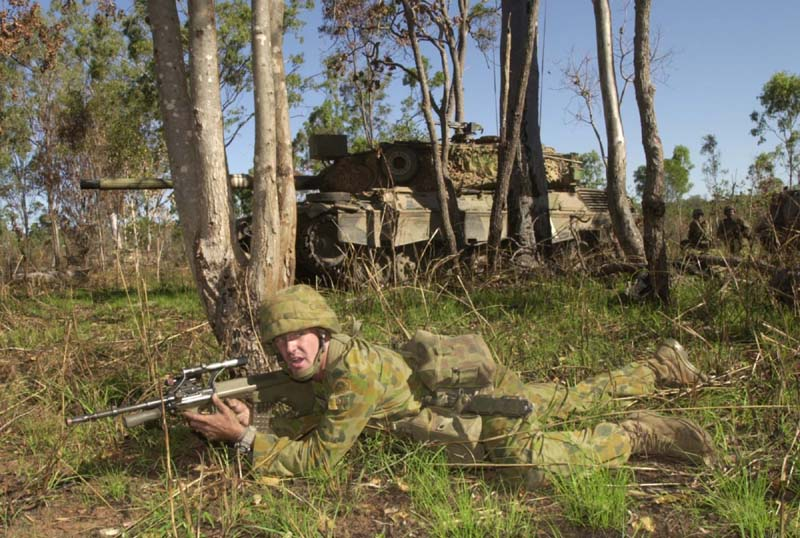
A soldier of the 5/7th Battalion, The Royal Australian Regiment, conducts fire and movement during training.

In 1992, the brigade began the process of moving to Darwin as part of a force structure review focused upon relocating defence assets in the north. By 2000, the brigade had completed its move and was headquartered in Robertson Barracks in Darwin. Before the move was complete, the brigade was warned out to support the 3rd Brigade's deployment to East Timor and in October 1999, 5/7 RAR began deploying. They returned to Australia in April 2000.

As part of the Hardened and Networked Army initiative 5/7 RAR was de-linked in 2006 to form two mechanised battalions. 5 RAR remained in Darwin, while the 7th Battalion, Royal Australian Regiment (7 RAR), along elements of the 1st Combat Service Support Battalion was moved to Adelaide, where they are now based at RAAF Base Edinburgh. Although the brigade is split, the Adelaide–Darwin Railway can be used to transport heavy vehicles and equipment north. In its current configuration, the brigade is currently capable of operating three battlegroups, one formed around 1st Armoured Regiment as an armour-heavy formation and the other two around 5 RAR and 7 RAR operating as mechanised infantry formations.

In the first decade of the 21st century, units of the brigade have undertaken deployments to East Timor, Iraq and Afghanistan.

=== Planned restructure ===
In late 2011, the Australian government announced that under a restructuring program known as Plan Beersheba, the 1st, 3rd and 7th Brigades would be reformed as combined arms Combat Brigades. Each will have a similar structure and capabilities, consisting of: a Brigade Headquarters, an Armoured Cavalry Regiment, two Standard Infantry Battalions, an Artillery Regiment, a Combat Engineer Regiment, a Combat Service Support Battalion and a Combat Signals Regiment. Under the new plan, the 2nd Cavalry Regiment was transferred to the 3rd Brigade in October–November 2014, transitioning to the ACR structure.

== Organisation ==
As of 2024, 1st Brigade is made up of the following units:

- Headquarters 1st Brigade (Robertson Barracks – Darwin);
- 5th/7th Battalion, Royal Australian Regiment (Robertson Barracks – Darwin);
- 8th/12th Regiment, Royal Australian Artillery (Robertson Barracks – Darwin);
- 1st Combat Engineer Regiment (Robertson Barracks – Darwin);
- 1st Combat Signal Regiment (Robertson Barracks – Darwin);
- 1st Combat Service Support Battalion (Robertson Barracks – Darwin).

In October 2017, the 1st Armoured Regiment moved from Robertson Barracks in Darwin to RAAF Base Edinburgh, joining 7 RAR which moved there in 2010–2011.

In late October 2022, the 1st Armoured Regiment and the 7th Battalion, Royal Australian Regiment were transferred to the 9th Brigade.
