= James Heane =

Australian general

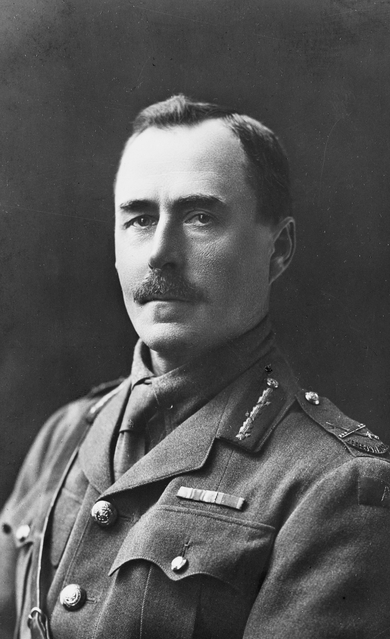
- Brigadier General James Heane c. 1917
- Born: 29 December 1874; Sydney, New South Wales
- Died: 20 August 1954 (aged 79); Collaroy, New South Wales
- Military career
- Allegiance: Australia
- Branch: Australian Army
- Service years: 1899–1935
- Rank: Brigadier General
- Nickname: "Cast Iron Jimmy"
- Commands: 5th Brigade (1921–26); 11th Brigade (1920–21); 1st Division Demobilization Group (1919); 2nd Brigade (1916–19); 1st Battalion (1916)
- Conflicts: First World War; Gallipoli Campaign; Landing at Anzac Cove; Battle of Lone Pine; Western Front; Battle of Pozières; Battle of the Menin Road Ridge; Battle of Broodseinde; Hundred Days Offensive
- Awards: Companion of the Order of the Bath; Companion of the Order of St Michael and St George; Distinguished Service Order; Colonial Auxiliary Forces Officers' Decoration; Mentioned in Despatches (7); Croix de Guerre (Belgium)
- Other work: President of the Fruitgrowers Federation of New South Wales

James Heane, CB, CMG, DSO, VD (29 December 1874 – 20 August 1954) was an Australian Army colonel and temporary brigadier general in the First World War. He retired in 1935 as a brigadier.

== Early life and career ==
James Heane was born in Sydney, New South Wales, on 29 December 1874, the son of Emily née Tuting and her husband, also a James Heane, both of whom were immigrants from England. He received his schooling at Dubbo Superior Public School and then Sydney Boys High School. After completing his education, he became a certified auditor. He later took up farming in the Dubbo district.

Heane joined the local militia in 1899 and was commissioned as a second lieutenant in the 3rd Australian Infantry Regiment. He had previously served in the Cadet Corps for five years. In 1903 and now a lieutenant, he joined the 2nd Light Horse Regiment. When compulsory military training was introduced in Australia in 1910, Heane was appointed area officer in Dubbo.

== First World War ==
On 3 September 1914, Heane was appointed to the Australian Imperial Force with the rank of captain as a company commander in the 4th Infantry Battalion. After the battalion was reorganised in Egypt, Heane was given command of D Company and promoted to major.

Heane went ashore at Anzac late in the morning of 25 April 1915 and formed Major General William Bridges last reserve until it was committed to the fighting at Lone Pine late in the afternoon. Heane earned the nickname "Cast Iron Jimmy" for his gallantry under fire in the fighting at Lone Pine on the 26th, when the 4th Battalion moved across the 400 Plateau and occupied Johnson's Jolly for a time, Heane returning from there after dark. On 1 May, Heane led a company forward under fire to support a small force. For this he was awarded the Distinguished Service Order (DSO) in the 1915 Birthday Honours and Mentioned in Despatches. He was wounded three times: in the thumb on 2 July; in the mouth; and then in the attack on Lone Pine on 7 August 1915. He was wounded so badly at Lone Pine that he was evacuated and hospitalised finally rejoining his battalion at Tel el Kebir, Egypt, in January 1916.

Heane was promoted to lieutenant colonel and given command of the 1st Infantry Battalion, which he took to the Western Front. On 23 July 1916, the battalion was committed to the line at Pozières, advancing through the town itself. Afterwards, Heane personally walked the whole front and carefully thinned out the line so that the minimum number of men would be exposed to the enemy artillery when it discovered their location. In the fighting, the 1st Battalion lost 13 officers and 473 other ranks, about half its strength. For his leadership at Pozières, Heane was made a Companion of the Order of St Michael and St George.

During 1916, Heane had been acting commander of the 1st Infantry Brigade twice. On 3 December 1916, he was promoted to full colonel and temporary brigadier general and given command of the 2nd Infantry Brigade. But on 7 December, after going up to the front line and crossing several empty and apparently unused saps that were little more than ditches half filled with muddy slime, Heane found himself in a trench occupied by German soldiers. Realising that he had made a grave mistake, Heane headed for the Australian lines but was wounded in the head before he reached it. He was evacuated to England.

Heane rejoined his unit in January 1917, and led in his brigade the Battles of Bullecourt, Menin Road, Broodseinde, Passchendaele, Lys, Lihons and Chuignes. For his services in command of the 2nd Infantry Brigade, Heane was made a Companion of the Order of the Bath (CB) and Mentioned in Despatches five more times.

== Post-war ==
In March 1919, Heane took over the 1st Division Demobilisation Group at Tidworth Camp. He returned to Australia where his appointment to the AIF ended on 7 January 1920. In July 1920 he took over command of the 11th Infantry Brigade. From April 1921 to June 1926 he commanded the 5th Infantry Brigade. He was also honorary colonel of the 4th Battalion from 1926 until he was transferred to the retired list as an honorary brigadier in 1935. During the Second World War he was commander of the Volunteer Defence Corps in New South Wales from 1940 to 1942.

Heane settled on a large citrus orchard in West Pennant Hills, New South Wales. From 1922 to 1941 he was also president of the Fruitgrowers' Federation of New South Wales. He died on 20 August 1954 and was cremated.

== See also ==
- List of Australian generals
