= 1st Battalion (Australia) =

Australian Army infantry battalion

1st Battalion, AIF later 1st Battalion, Royal New South Wales Regiment
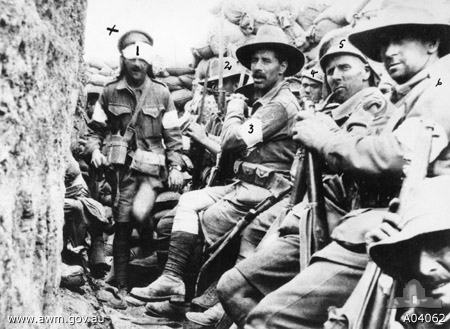
- 5 members of 1st Battalion waiting to be relieved by troops of 7th Battalion at Gallipoli, August 1915
- Active: 1914–1919; 1921–1930; 1957–1960; 1965–1971
- Country: Australia
- Branch: Australian Army
- Type: Infantry
- Role: Line infantry
- Size: ~1,000 men
- Part of: 1st Brigade, 1st Division (First World War)
- Colours: Black over green
- Engagements: Mahdist War; Second Boer War; First World War

Commanders
- Notable commanders: James Heane

Insignia
- Unit colour patch

The 1st Battalion was an infantry battalion of the Australian Army. Although its numerical name was designated during the First World War, the 1st Battalion can trace its lineage back to 1854, when a unit of the Volunteer Rifles was raised in Sydney. This unit has since been redesignated a number of times, but through its links with the units of the colonial NSW defence force, the battalion's history includes services in Sudan and South Africa. During the First World War, the 1st Battalion was raised for overseas service in 1914 as part of the First Australian Imperial Force. Attached to the 1st Brigade, the battalion served in Egypt initially before taking part in the fighting in Gallipoli against the Ottomans. Later the battalion was sent to the Western Front where it fought in the trenches in France and Belgium as part of the Australian Corps. Following the end of the war the battalion was disbanded in 1919.

In 1921, the battalion was reformed as part of the Militia as the "1st Battalion (East Sydney Regiment)". Throughout the interwar years the unit's designation changed a couple of times and for a time it was amalgamated with the 19th Battalion. During the Second World War the battalion served as garrison force in Australia before being disbanded in 1944 due to manpower shortages. Following the war the 1st Battalion was not re-raised until 1957 when it was reformed as a commando unit in Sydney as the "1st Infantry Battalion (Commando) (City of Sydney's Own Regiment)" before being reduced to a company-sized element in the Pentropic 1st Battalion, Royal New South Wales Regiment. In 1965, the battalion was reformed as the non-Pentropically established "1st Battalion, Royal New South Wales Regiment (Commando)". It maintained the commando role until 1971 when it was amalgamated once again with the 19th Battalion to become the 1st/19th Battalion, Royal New South Wales Regiment, a unit of the Australian Army Reserve that remains in existence today.

== History ==
=== Lineage ===
Although the 1st Battalion was not technically established until 1914, the unit takes its lineage from units that were raised in Sydney sixty years before then. Indeed, the 1st Battalion was the oldest infantry battalion from New South Wales and is a successor unit of the Sydney Volunteer Rifles which were raised in 1854 in the then colony of New South Wales in response to concerns about possible threats posed by Russian naval forces in the Pacific during the Crimean War. Following that the unit went through a number of changes in composition and designation as the various colonial defence forces were reorganised during the mid to late 19th Century. By 1860 the unit had become known as the "Sydney Battalion", but in 1878 following the decision to introduce a system of partial payment for volunteer soldiers, the unit was absorbed into the 1st Regiment of New South Wales Volunteer Infantry.

In 1885, the 1st Regiment provided a detachment of one officer and 75 men to serve in Sudan during the Mahdist War, for which they received the battle honour "Suakin 1885". During the Second Boer War 12 officers and 91 men from the regiment served in South Africa as part of the New South Wales contingent, for which they were later recognised with the battle honour of "South Africa 1899–1902". Following Federation the regiment became the 1st Australian Infantry Regiment. A system of universal training was introduced in 1911. Due to the large increase in the size of the Army the existing regiments were reorganised and redesignated. As a result, the regiment was split into three units—the 21st, 24th and 26th Infantry.

=== First World War ===
Following the outbreak of the First World War the decision was made to raise an expeditionary force known as the First Australian Imperial Force (AIF) which would exist alongside the Militia units that already existed. This was largely because the provisions of the Defence Act 1901 prohibited sending conscripts overseas to fight, but was also in part due to the need to maintain a military presence in Australia in case of emergency or attack while the 1st AIF was deployed overseas. Although initially there were limits placed upon the numbers of militiamen that could enlist as there was a requirement to man coastal defences and guard vital installations, large numbers of militiamen did enlist and were largely allocated to AIF units based upon locality. As a result, many of the AIF units became associated with the Militia units from where they were located and to some extent there was an attempt to maintain the identity of these units within the AIF. Up to 100 men from the pre-war 1st Infantry Regiment are believed to have served in various AIF units during the war, including the 1st Battalion. Some prominent members include William Holmes, Sydney Herring and James Heane.

Among the units raised by the AIF, the 1st Battalion was one of the first infantry units raised in New South Wales, being formed at Randwick in Sydney in August 1914, within the first fortnight of the war. After a brief period of basic training the 1st Battalion was among the first Australian troops to be deployed overseas, arriving in Egypt on 2 December 1914.

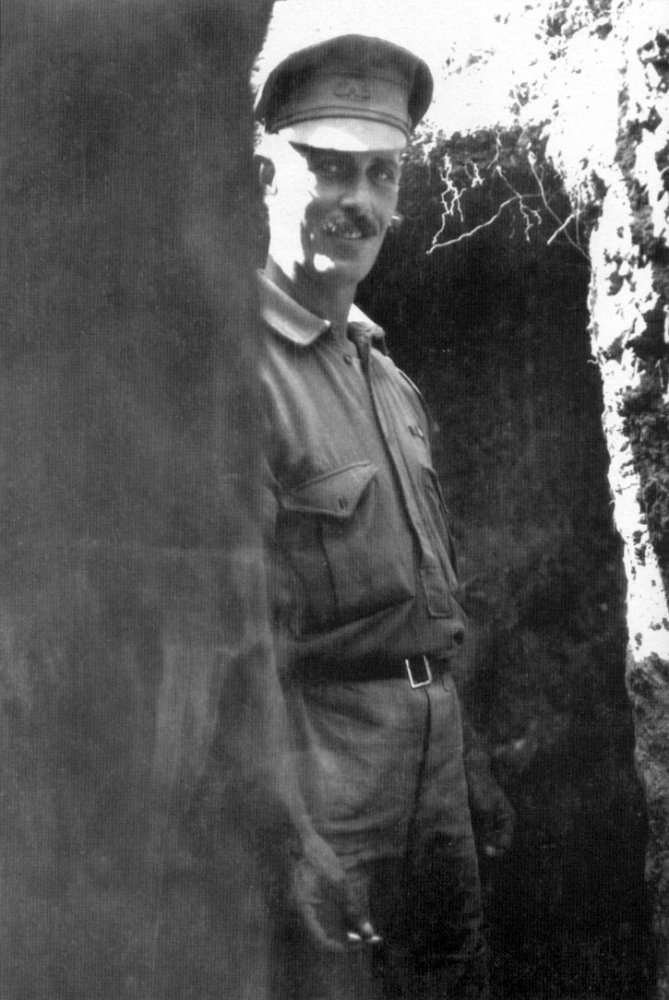
Alfred Shout, one of the 1st Battalion's Victoria Cross recipients, at Quinn's Post, Gallipoli, on 7 June 1915.

After undertaking further training and serving in a static defence role around the Suez Canal, the battalion took part in the Landing at Anzac Cove, coming ashore with the second and third waves on 25 April 1915. Following the initial battle for the heights overlooking the beachhead in which the battalion took part in the attack on the hill known as Baby 700, the Turks regained control of the heights and the battalion was forced to withdraw to Russel Top and then later to the southern flank near Gaba Tebe. On 27 April, the battalion carried out a desperate bayonet charge for which one of the battalion's officers, Alfred John Shout received a Military Cross and was Mentioned in Despatches.

In August, the Allies went on the offensive on the Gallipoli peninsula launching the August Offensive. As part of this offensive, the 1st Division was called upon to launch a diversionary attack with the Battle of Lone Pine. It was during this battle that the battalion took part in arguably its most notable engagement of the campaign. The attack began early on 6 August and after only an hour, the Australians had captured the Turkish positions at Lone Pine. The Turks counterattacked almost immediately and for the course of the next three days the fighting continued, during which time two members of the battalion, Alfred Shout and Leonard Keysor, performed acts of valour for which they were later awarded the Victoria Cross. The Allies evacuated Gallipoli in December 1915 and the 1st Battalion returned to Egypt. While in Egypt the AIF underwent a period of expansion and re-organisation, during which time a number of men from the 1st Battalion were transferred to the newly formed 53rd Battalion. In early 1916, the AIF's infantry divisions were sent to France where over the course of the next two-and-a-half years they would take part in the fighting against the Germans on the Western Front.

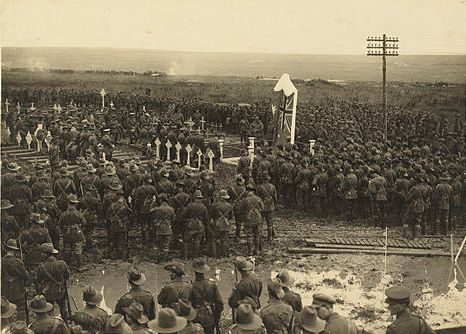
An Australian Chaplain delivering the sermon at the unveiling of memorial to the 1st Australian Battalion, Pozieres

The battalion's first major action in France was at Pozières in July 1916. Later the battalion fought at Ypres, in Belgium, before returning to the Somme in winter. At Bullecourt in May 1917, George Julian Howell became the third member of the battalion to receive the Victoria Cross. In 1918, the 1st Battalion helped to stop the German spring offensive in March and April before taking part in the Hundred Days Offensive that was launched near Amiens on 8 August 1918 and ultimately brought an end to the war. The battalion remained in the line until late September 1918, when they were withdrawn from the front along with the rest of the Australian Corps for rest and retraining in anticipation of further operations. On 21 September all but one member of "D" Company refused to take part in an attack as a protest against the battalion being sent back into combat when it had been about to be relieved. The members of the company were subsequently imprisoned for desertion; this was the AIF's largest incidence of "combat refusal" during the war and formed part of a general weakening in the force's discipline due to the stresses of prolonged combat. The battalion was out of the line when the Armistice was declared on 11 November 1918. Following the end of hostilities, the process of demobilisation began and slowly the battalion's numbers dwindled as its personnel were repatriated to Australia. They were finally disbanded in May 1919.

Throughout the course of the war, the 1st Battalion suffered a total of 1,165 men killed and 2,363 wounded. Members of the battalion received the following decorations: three Victoria Crosses, two Companions of the Order of St Michael and St George, seven Distinguished Service Orders with one Bar, 40 Military Crosses with one Bar, 29 Distinguished Conduct Medals, 131 Military Medals, nine Meritorious Service Medal and 57 Mentions in Despatches.

=== Inter war years ===
In 1918, the pre-war Militia units were re-organised once more into multi-battalion regiments. It was decided that the reconstituted regiments would be numbered after AIF battalions and that each would comprise three to six battalions with the first battalion being formed from inactive ex-AIF soldiers, members of the Citizen Military Force forming the second and senior cadets forming the third. As a result of this, the 21st Infantry Regiment was re-designated as the 1st Infantry Regiment. A further review of defence requirements was carried out in 1920, after which it was determined that the Militia should be further reorganised to perpetuate the battle honours and designations of the AIF. On 1 April 1921 the AIF was officially disbanded and a month later the new organisation of the Militia was adopted. As a part of this reorganisation, the Citizen Force battalion of each regiment was separated and adopted the numerical designation of the AIF battalion with which it was associated, as well as its unit colour patch and battle honours.

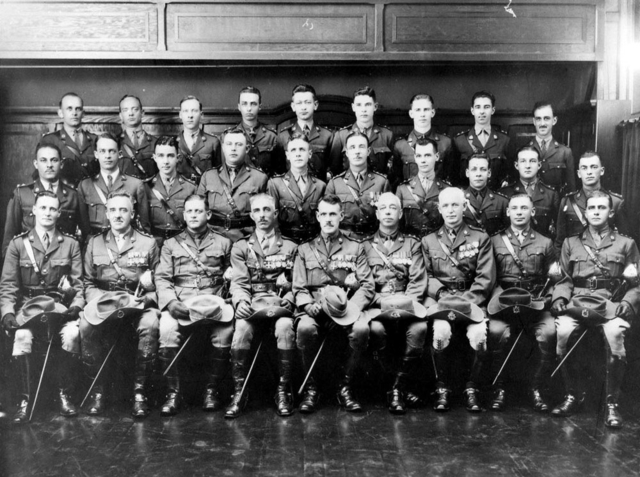
Officers from the 1st/19th Battalion, November 1932

As a result of this the 5th Battalion, 1st Infantry Regiment was redesignated the 1st Battalion and was attached to the 9th Brigade, 2nd Division. In 1927, territorial titles were introduced and the battalion officially adopted the designation of 1st Battalion (East Sydney Regiment), which it had unofficially used since 1921. In 1929, following the election of the Scullin Labor government, the compulsory training scheme was abolished and in its place a new system was introduced whereby the Citizens Forces would be maintained on a part-time, voluntary basis only. It was also renamed the "Militia" at this time. The decision to suspend compulsory training, coupled with the economic downturn of the Great Depression meant that the manpower of many Militia units dropped considerably and as a result the decision was made to amalgamate a number of units. On 1 July 1930, the 1st Battalion was amalgamated with the 19th Battalion, later adopting the title of the 1st/19th Battalion (City of Sydney's Own Regiment). The two battalions remained linked until 1939 when due to the prospects of war a number of Militia battalions were delinked in preparation for an expansion of the Army. For a brief period after this the battalion was known as the 1st Battalion (City of Sydney Regiment).

=== Second World War and later ===
With the outbreak of the Second World War once again the government made the decision to form an overseas expeditionary force outside of the pre-existing Militia units. To maintain the ability of the Army to defend Australia should Japan enter the war, it was decided once again to limit the number of militiamen that were allowed to enlist in the Second Australian Imperial Force (2nd AIF) to roughly one quarter. While the units of the 2nd AIF were sent overseas to England, North Africa and the Middle East, the militia remained in Australia to carry out various garrison duties and training to improve the nation's overall readiness. Following Japan's entry into the war in December 1941 this changed and over the course of 1942–45 many Militia units were mobilised and deployed to fight in New Guinea, New Britain, Bougainville and Borneo. In any case over 207,000 militiamen transferred from the Militia to the AIF throughout the course of the war. As a result of this, and the serious manpower shortages experienced by the Australian economy from October 1942 onwards eight Militia battalions were disbanded while another eleven more were broken up and their personnel distributed to other units. as part of this in October 1942, the 1st Battalion was amalgamate with the 45th Battalion to form the 1st/45th Battalion. However in 1944 the 1st/45th Battalion was disbanded having not deployed overseas. Prior to this, though, the battalion was reorganised in August 1942 with its machine gun company being transferred to form the 6th Machine Gun Battalion along with several other Militia machine gun companies.

After World War II the Citizens Military Force was reformed in 1948, although the 1st Battalion was not re-raised at that time. In 1957, it was decided to expand the 1st Commando Company as a full battalion named the 1st Infantry Battalion (Commando), City of Sydney's Own Regiment. When the CMF was reorganised in 1960 along the Pentropic division concept, this unit was once more reduced to company size, forming No. 1 Commando Company (The City of Sydney Company), 1st Battalion, Royal New South Wales Regiment. In 1965, when the Pentropic establishment was discontinued this company was once again raised to a full battalion sized unit, forming the non-Pentropic 1st Battalion, Royal New South Wales Regiment (Commando). The battalion maintained the commando role until 1971 when it was amalgamated with the 19th Battalion to become 1st/19th Battalion, Royal New South Wales Regiment, a unit which remains in existence today and perpetuates the honours of the 1st Battalion and its predecessor units as well as that of the 19th Battalion. The 1st Commando Company was subsequently re-raised as a separate unit and later subsumed into the 1st Commando Regiment.

== Battle honours ==
The 1st Battalion carried the following battle honours:

- Suakin 1885.
- Boer War: South Africa 1899–1902.
- First World War: Hazebrouck, Amiens, Albert 1918 (Chuignes), Hindenburg Line (twice), Epehy, France and Flanders 1916–1918, ANZAC, Landing at ANZAC, Suvla, Sari Bair–Lone Pine, Somme 1916, Somme 1918, Pozieres, Bullecourt, Ypres 1917, Menin Road, Polygon Wood, Broodseinde, Poelcappelle, Passchendaele, Lys.
