= William Symons =

William Symons VC
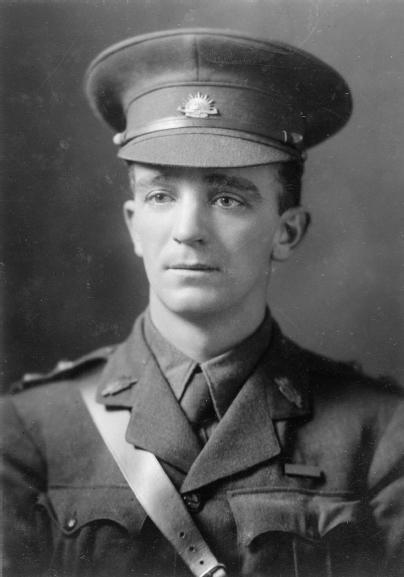
- Lieutenant William Symons c.1915–16
- Born: 10 July 1889; Bendigo, Australia
- Died: 24 June 1948 (aged 58); Paddington, England
- Military career
- Allegiance: Australia
- Branch: Australian Army; Home Guard
- Service years: 1906–1918; 1941–1944
- Rank: Lieutenant Colonel
- Units: 7th Battalion
- Conflicts: First World War; Battle of Lone Pine; Second World War
- Awards: Victoria Cross

William John Symons, VC (10 July 1889 – 24 June 1948) was an Australian recipient of the Victoria Cross, the highest award for gallantry in the face of the enemy that can be awarded to British and Commonwealth forces.

He was 26 years old, and a second lieutenant in the 7th Battalion, (Victoria), Australian Imperial Force during the First World War when the following deed took place for which he was awarded the VC.

On 8–9 August 1915, at Lone Pine, Gallipoli, Turkey, Symons was in command of a section of newly captured trenches and repelled several counter-attacks with great coolness. An enemy attack on an isolated sap early in the morning resulted in six officers becoming casualties and part of the sap being lost, but Symons retook it, shooting two Turks. The sap was then attacked from three sides and this officer managed, in the face of heavy fire, to build a barricade. On the enemy setting fire to the head cover, he extinguished it and rebuilt the barricade. His coolness and determination finally compelled the enemy to withdraw.

On 2 February 1916, Lt. Col. (later Major-General) Harold "Pompey" Elliott, commanding the 7th Battalion, wrote to his wife Kate about the action at Lone Pine when the 7th won four Victoria Crosses, including Symons. He describes the infiltration of the Australian trenches by the attacking Turks and the exchange of shots and grenades. Captain Bastin was shot through the arm and stretchered out of the trench but the Turks entered the trench a second time. Elliott writes that when the Australian's waivered he got together a few fresh men and placed Symons in charge with the order to charge the Turks at bayonet point. In a trench described as being full of dead men, blood and brains, Symons succeeded to Elliott's admiration.

Even though Elliot promoted the bravery of his men, he was concerned about being overlooked for his promotion and awards. Whilst on English convalescence leave an interested King George V presented Symons with his VC. Symons told the King about the action and the award of four Victoria Crosses. During the conversation he asked why Elliott has never been even mentioned in dispatches after being through the Gallipoli campaign and been wounded. The King's secretary took Elliot's name and in his letter to Kate, on 18 February 1916, Elliott announced his promotion to Brigadier-General.

Symons later achieved the rank of lieutenant colonel during the Second World War.

His Victoria Cross is displayed at the Australian War Memorial, Canberra, Australia.
