= Battle of Lone Pine =

Battle of the Gallipoli campaign in WWI

Coordinates: 40°13′49″N 26°17′14″E

- Part of the Gallipoli campaign of the First World War
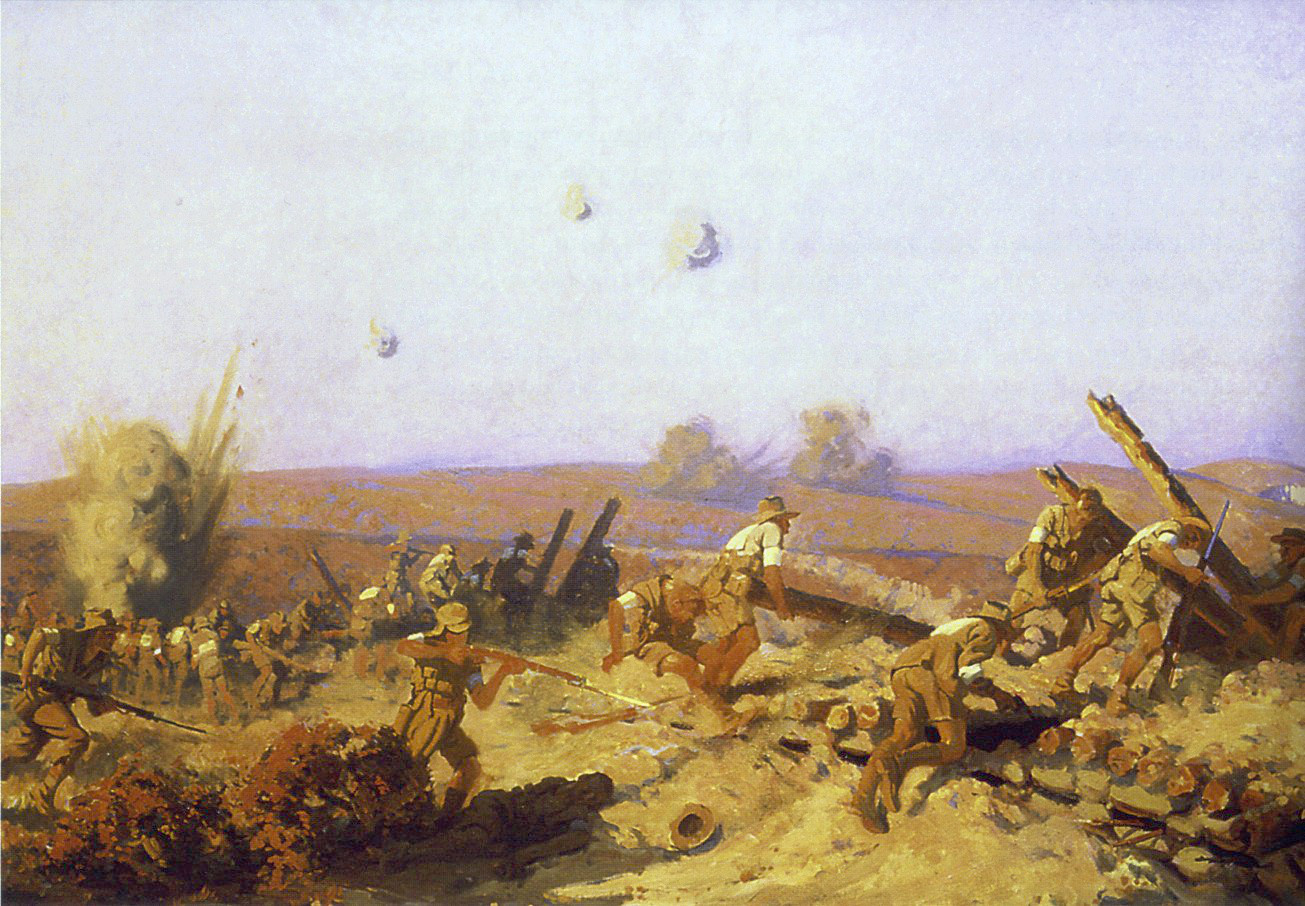
- Detail from The Taking of Lone Pine by Fred Leist, 1921
Date	6–10 August 1915
Location	Gallipoli, Ottoman Empire (present-day Turkey)
Result	Allied victory

Belligerents
British Empire: Australia; New Zealand	Ottoman Empire

Commanders and leaders
(British Empire) Harold Walker	(Ottoman Empire) Esat Pasha

Strength
1 brigade, reinforced by 2 more battalions	2 battalions, reinforced by 3 regiments

Casualties and losses
2,277	~5,000–7,000

The Battle of Lone Pine, also known as the Battle of Bloody Ridge (Turkish: Kanlı Sırt Muharebesi), (Note: "Kanlı Sırt" roughly translates to "Bloody Ridge".) was fought between Australian and New Zealand Army Corps (ANZAC) and Ottoman Empire (Note: The modern nation of Turkey did not exist until 1923 and at the time of the fighting at Gallipoli, the peninsula was part of the Ottoman Empire, which had been founded in 1299. Nevertheless, many English-language sources on the First World War use the term "Turkey" instead of "Ottoman Empire". The sources used in this article vary in the approach they take. Fewster, Basarin & Basarin use "Ottoman", while Wahlert, Bean, Cameron, Coulthard-Clark and others use "Turk" or "Turkish".) forces during the Gallipoli campaign of the First World War, between 6 and 10 August 1915. The battle was part of a diversionary attack to draw Ottoman attention away from the main assaults being conducted by British, Indian and New Zealand troops around Sari Bair, Chunuk Bair and Hill 971, which became known as the August Offensive.

At Lone Pine, the assaulting force, initially consisting of the Australian 1st Brigade, managed to capture the main trench line from the two Ottoman battalions that were defending the position in the first few hours of the fighting on 6 August. Over the next three days, the fighting continued as the Ottomans brought up reinforcements and launched numerous counterattacks in an attempt to recapture the ground they had lost. As the counterattacks intensified the ANZACs brought up two fresh battalions to reinforce their newly gained line. Finally, on 9 August the Ottomans called off any further attempts and by 10 August offensive action ceased, leaving the Allies in control of the position. Nevertheless, despite the ANZAC victory, the wider August Offensive of which the attack had been a part failed and a situation of stalemate developed around Lone Pine which lasted until the end of the campaign in December 1915 when Allied troops were evacuated from the peninsula.

== Prelude ==
=== Terrain ===
The Lone Pine battlefield was named for a solitary Turkish pine that stood there at the start of the fighting; The tree was also known by the Anzac soldiers as the "Lonesome Pine". The battlefield was situated near the centre of the eastern line of the Australian and New Zealand trenches around Anzac Cove on a rise known as "400 Plateau" that joined "Bolton's Ridge" to the south with the ridge along the east side of "Monash Valley" to the north. Being towards the southern end of the area around Anzac Cove, the terrain in the Lone Pine region was comparatively gentle and the opposing trenches were separated some distance with a flat no-man's land intervening. Due to its location relative to the beachhead and the shape of the intervening ground, Lone Pine's importance lay in the fact that its position provided a commanding view of the Australian and New Zealand rear areas. From the 400 Plateau it was possible to observe as far south as Gaba Tepe and its possession would have afforded the Ottomans the ability to place the approaches to the Second Ridge under fire, preventing the flow of reinforcements and supplies from the beachhead to the forward trenches.

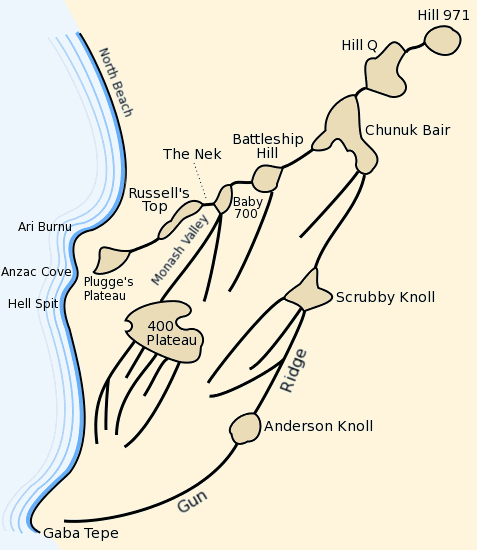
The main features of the area surrounding Anzac Cove. Lone Pine lies on the south-west arm of the kidney-shaped 400 Plateau. "Johnson's Jolley" lies on the north-west arm of the 400 Plateau, while "Owen's Gulley" lies in the crook of the 400 Plateau. "Anderson Knoll" lies to the south-west, while Monash Valley lies to the north. "Gun Ridge" was also referred to as the "Third Ridge". "Legge Valley" lies in between Lone Pine and the "Anderson Knoll".

The main part of the Australian position at Lone Pine was centred on a feature known as "The Pimple", (Note: The Ottomans called this position "Sehidler Tepesi", which is translated into English as "Martyr's Hill".) where a salient had developed at the point where the Australians' position was closest to the Ottoman line. To the east of the salient, opposite The Pimple, the Ottoman line extended from the head of a gully—known as "Owen's Gulley" by the Australians—south for 400 yards (370 m) towards the neck of Bolton's Ridge and continued south along a spur called "Sniper's Ridge". Because of the salient around The Pimple, the Ottomans had focused on developing the trenches along the flanks of the position more than the centre, and had placed the firing positions in the centre in depth in order to gain the advantage of being able to pour enfilade fire upon any attacking force. At the rear of the Ottoman line, near Owen's Gully, was a depression called "The Cup" that was not visible from the Australians' position on The Pimple. Despite overflights of the area by British reconnaissance aircraft in June, the Australians were unaware of The Cup's existence, and at the time of the attack they believed this area to be flat and to consist of further trench lines. In reality it was actually a reserve area where the Ottomans had established a regimental headquarters and sited a series of bivouacs in terraces and at the time of the attack there were large numbers of reinforcements camped there.

=== Military situation ===
Prior to the battle, isolated fighting around Lone Pine had begun early in the Gallipoli campaign. At around 7:00 a.m. on the first day of the Australian and New Zealand landings at Anzac Cove, 25 April 1915, elements of the Australian force had pushed through to Lone Pine in an effort to destroy an Ottoman artillery battery that had been firing down upon the landing beach. Before the Australians could engage the battery, the Ottomans had withdrawn to a ridge to the south-west, which the Australians later dubbed "Third Ridge" (or "Gun Ridge"). Pressing further inland, troops from the 6th Battalion had attempted to reach the ridge, crossing a wide valley (later known as "Legge Valley"), but they were pushed back when an Ottoman regiment, the 27th, had launched a counterattack from the south-east towards Lone Pine at 10:00 a.m., with the objective of retaking the 400 Plateau. Rolling up the 6th Battalion, the Ottomans pushed the Australians back to Pine Ridge, a finger of land that jutted south from Lone Pine towards Gaba Tebe. Taking heavy casualties, the Australians withdrew north to Lone Pine, where they were able to establish a defensive position. As reinforcements were brought up from New Zealand units, in the afternoon a second Ottoman regiment, the 77th, arrived and heavy hand-to-hand fighting ensued before the counterattack was blunted. Further fighting around Lone Pine continued throughout the early stages of the campaign, but eventually a stalemate developed in which neither side was able to advance and static trench warfare began.

In early July 1915, while making plans for an offensive to break the deadlock that had developed around the Gallipoli Peninsula following the initial landings in April, the commander of the Australian and New Zealand Army Corps, Lieutenant General William Birdwood, had determined that an attack at Lone Pine could be used to divert Ottoman attention away from a main attack that would be launched by a combined force of British, Indian and New Zealand troops further north around Sari Bair, Chunuk Bair and Hill 971. (Note: The Ottoman name for Chunuk Bair was "Conk Bayiri", while Hill 971 was known as "Koca Cimen Tepe", which is translated as "Hill of the Great Pasture".) The Australian 1st Infantry Brigade was chosen to undertake the attack on Lone Pine, and consisted of about 3,000 men, under the command of a British officer, Colonel Nevill Smyth. Along with the 2nd and 3rd Infantry Brigades, the 1st Infantry Brigade was part of the Australian 1st Division. The division's commander was Brigadier General Harold Walker, a British officer who had replaced Major General William Bridges as temporary commander after Bridges had been killed by a sniper in May. Walker did not like the idea of launching an attack at Lone Pine, let alone a mere diversion, but when General Sir Ian Hamilton, the commander of the Mediterranean Expeditionary Force, insisted the attack proceed, through thorough planning, Walker endeavoured to give his troops the best chance of success possible on such an unfavourable battleground.

The Ottoman forces opposing the Australians at Lone Pine consisted of two battalions from the 47th Regiment, under the command of Tevfik Bey. These battalions amounted to a total of about 1,000 men, of which 500 were positioned in the trenches along the front, while another 500 were positioned further back in depth. Sitting further back in divisional reserve, to the north-east on "Mortar Ridge", (Note: The Ottomans called this position "Edirne Sirt", which is translated into English as "Adrianople Spur".) was a battalion from the 57th Regiment, which had been relieved from its position on the front line north of Lone Pine by an Arab battalion of the 72nd Regiment. The positions north and south of the Ottoman line at Lone Pine were held by the 125th Regiment at Johnston's Jolly (Note: Johnston's Jolly was known to the Ottomans as "Kirmizi Sirt".) in the north and the 48th Regiment in the south along Pine Ridge.

== Battle ==
=== Preparation ===
The width of the front of the attack was 160 yards (150 m) and the distance between the two trench lines was about 60–100 yards (55–91 m). To reduce the distance to be crossed, the Australians projected a number of tunnels towards the Ottoman trenches from The Pimple. Immediately after the attack, one of these tunnels was to be opened along its length to make a communications trench through which reinforcements could advance without having to cross the exposed ground. Some of the attackers would have to make the advance over open ground from the Australian trench line. To provide some measure of protection for these men, three mines were set by engineers to make craters in which they could seek shelter. The preliminary bombardment was stretched over three days—initially confined to a limited "slow shoot", building up to a final intense bombardment an hour before the assault—and was successful in cutting much of the barbed wire that the Ottomans had placed in front of their position. The preparation stage of the attack began at 2:00 p.m. on 6 August, when the Australians detonated the three mines they had dug in front of the Ottoman lines, in an attempt to create cover for the advancing troops. Two and a half hours later the final heavy preliminary bombardment commenced, with Australian, British and New Zealand artillery batteries firing on the Ottoman trench line, while naval gunfire support from the British cruiser HMS Bacchante provided counter-battery fire on Ottoman artillery positioned along Third Ridge. Retreating into tunnels which had been cut as part of mining operations, the majority of the forward Ottoman troops were able to find shelter from the bombardment that lasted for an hour.

While the artillery prepared the ground for the attack, behind the Australian lines the assault formations moved up towards The Pimple. Smyth sited his brigade headquarters at a position called "Brown's Dip", which was about 200 metres (220 yd) south of the firing line. Due to the small front along which the attack was to be launched, the initial assault was to be undertaken in three waves by the 2nd, 3rd and 4th Battalions while the 1st Battalion was to remain back at Brown's Dip in reserve, ready to be brought up to consolidate any gains or respond in the event of a counterattack. Once the 1st Battalion had taken up its position, the assault battalions moved through them towards the forward line at The Pimple. Once the attack was launched, half the force would go via tunnels that had been dug out into no man's land, while the other half would simply go "over the top". By 5:00 p.m. all the troops had taken up their positions and as the barrage came to a conclusion, the tunnels were opened and final preparations were made.

Each soldier in the first two waves had been issued a total of 200 rounds of ammunition for his rifle, along with rations for one day, and miscellaneous equipment including a gas mask. The third wave had received the same amount of ammunition, but was also issued entrenching equipment that would be used to construct positions to defend the initial gains against the inevitable Ottoman counterattack. In support, each battalion had four Vickers medium machine-guns, which had been issued with 3,500 rounds, and contributed a platoon whose job would be to throw the 1,200 grenades that the brigade had been allocated for the attack. A small section of engineers was also allocated to undertake demolitions.

=== Initial assault ===
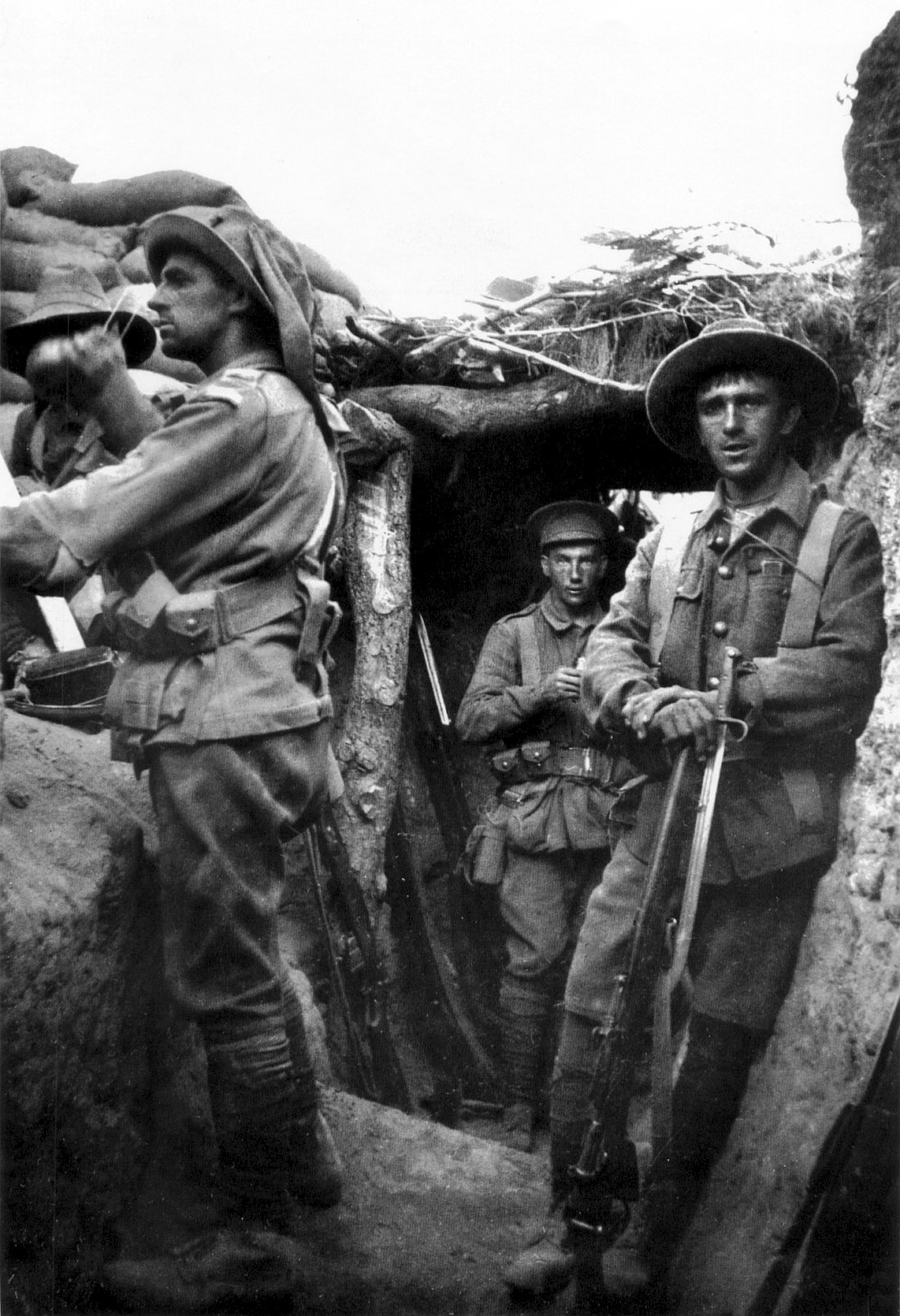
Australian troops in a captured Ottoman trench at Lone Pine, 6 August 1915

At 5:30 p.m. the Australian 1st Infantry Brigade attacked as the first wave of 1,800 men threw themselves forward. To their north, the troops of the 2nd Infantry Brigade laid down suppressing fire on the supporting Ottoman troops at Johnston's Jolly, while the 3rd Infantry and 2nd Light Horse Brigades held the line opposite Sniper's Ridge. Half the force went via the prepared tunnels and half crossed the exposed ground between the trench lines. Dubbed the "Daisy Patch", it amounted to a distance of about 100 metres (110 yd) and it was raked with Ottoman artillery and small arms fire. From his headquarters overlooking the fighting, the senior Ottoman commander Esad Pasa, began to co-ordinate the response, passing orders for reinforcements to be brought up and calling down artillery. Casualties among the first wave of attackers were "relatively light" as the defenders in the front line of Ottoman trenches were still sheltering from the preliminary bombardment and had not had time to return to their fire steps after it had been lifted.

When the Australians reached the Ottoman trenches they found them roofed with pine logs with no easy entrance, which had not been identified by aerial reconnaissance during the planning stages. As the Ottoman defenders recovered from the artillery barrage, they began firing at the Australians through specially cut holes at point blank range. As the second and third waves of the attack came up, some of the Australians fired, grenaded and bayoneted from above, while some found their way inside through gaps or by lifting the logs, which were in places as thick as 4 inches (10 cm) by 9 inches (23 cm). Others ran on past to the open communications and support trenches behind, where they were able to gain access to the trenches; about 70 Ottoman troops were captured as they attempted to escape and ran into the Australians entering the trenches. Small groups of Australians managed to push through to The Cup where they were stopped by Ottoman troops who were hastily assembled to defend their regimental headquarters. In the ensuing fighting there, almost all of the Australians were killed, while a handful were taken prisoner.

In the Ottoman trenches, the darkness and cramped conditions led to considerable confusion amongst the attackers. Due to concerns of shooting their comrades, the Australians were unable to fire their rifles initially, and the fighting devolved into a melee as the soldiers attacked each other with bayonets and grenades. The first Australians to enter the position were picked off by the defenders, but as the Australians established themselves in strength, they were able to break into the position before the defenders that had been sheltering in the tunnels behind the front line were able to fully respond. Over the space of half an hour the Australians took control of the position and, after ejecting the remaining Ottomans from the main trench, they established a number of defensive positions along the line. These amounted to positions in the communication trenches on the flanks of the captured ground and about seven or eight posts in the centre that were "isolated" but connected by hastily dug saps.

For the Australians, the attack had been successful, as they had gained possession of the main Ottoman line, and after being halted at The Cup they began preparing to defend their gains. Hastily erecting sandbag barriers along the parapet, they settled down to wait for the first counterattack. As they did so, the brigade reserve—the 1st Battalion—was brought up. Due to crowding in the tunnels that had been used for the attack, the reinforcements were sent via the open ground that had been in front of the old Ottoman positions; despite being behind the recently captured position, the ground was still subjected to heavy Ottoman artillery and machine-gun fire, which was being poured down from positions in overwatch on the flanks. Nevertheless, in company lots, the 1st Battalion moved up and began filling in the gaps between the assault battalions, while engineers from the 2nd Field Company began the task of extending the tunnels from The Pimple towards the new Australian line.

=== Ottoman counterattacks ===
Shortly after dark, around 7:00 p.m., the first Ottoman counterattack came after a group from the 1st Battalion, 57th Regiment, under Major Zeki Bey, arrived to reinforce the battalions of the 47th. Attacking with hand grenades, the fighting took place in the complicated maze of the former Ottoman trench system. The close quarters meant that some of the grenades would travel back and forth up to three times before exploding. The Australians held the old Ottoman fire trench and had footholds deeper in Ottoman lines. They blocked the Ottoman communications trenches as best they could, often with the bodies of the dead, to thwart raids. Other bodies were moved to unused communication trenches and saps, and where possible the wounded were evacuated, however, the fighting was so intense, the conditions so cramped and the men so exhausted that in many cases they were left to lie at the bottom of the trench.

Throughout the night of 6/7 August, the Ottomans brought up reinforcements from the 5th Division's 13th Regiment under Ali Riza Bey, which marched from Kojadere, south-east of the position known to the Australians as "Scrubby Knoll". The 9th Division, under German Colonel Hans Kannengiesser, also received orders to begin moving towards Lone Pine from its position between Helles and Anzac from Esad Pasa. Although the 9th Division was later diverted, after 8:00 p.m. the 15th Regiment, from the 5th Division, under the command of Ibrahim Sukru, was committed to the fighting, moving south from its position around the Kurt Dere, near Chunuk Blair.

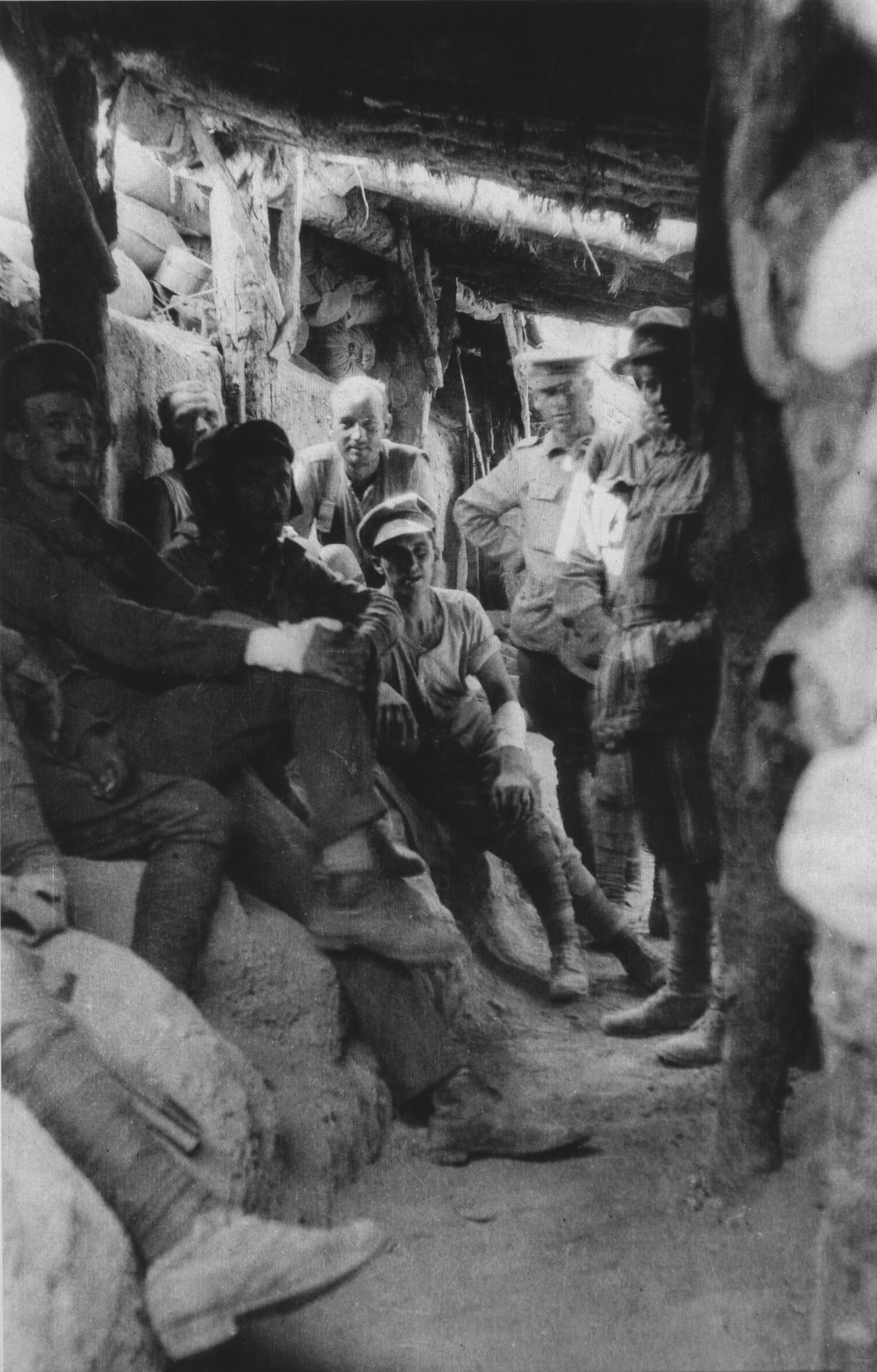
A captured Ottoman trench at Lone Pine

For the next three days the Ottomans continued to launch incessant and ultimately unsuccessful counterattacks in an effort to recapture the ground they had lost. In total three regiments were dispatched. The Australians also brought up reinforcements, moving up men from two battalions from the 2nd and 3rd Infantry Brigades—the 7th and 12th Battalions—to hold the 1st Brigade's gains. Throughout 7 August, the fighting devolved into a series of hand grenade duels. To keep up the supply, Australians put about 50 soldiers to work at Anzac Cove manufacturing makeshift grenades out of empty jam tins: over 1,000 were sent up to the 1st Infantry Brigade late on 7 August. The fighting continued throughout the night of 7/8 August as the 47th Regiment, launched a determined counterattack; suffering heavy casualties, including the regimental commander, Tewfik Bey, the attack was unsuccessful in retaking the main front-line trenches, but succeeded in regaining some of the ground in the north and also pushed the Australians back a little way from The Cup.

As Ali Riza Bey, the commander of the 13th Regiment, took charge of the Ottoman effort around Lone Pine, the grenading continued into the next day as the Ottomans began to prepare for a large-scale counterattack. Throughout the morning the remaining Australian positions overlooking The Cup were abandoned before the fighting stopped briefly as both the Australians and Ottomans evacuated their wounded and removed the dead from the front-line. By this time the 1st and 2nd Battalions, which had been defending the heavily counterattacked southern flank, had suffered so many casualties that they were withdrawn from the line, with the 7th Battalion moving into their positions late in the afternoon. The 3rd, 4th and 12th Battalions remained holding the north and centre of the Australian line.

Further attacks were mounted by the Ottomans all along the Australian line after 3:00 p.m., but after dark they focused their efforts on the 7th Battalion's position in the south; there the Ottomans succeeded in taking part of the Australian line late in the night, and fierce hand-to-hand fighting followed until early in the morning of 9 August as the Australians retook these positions. More grenade attacks were launched by Ottoman troops later that morning and as the Australian trenches were brought under fire from the Ottoman positions around Johnston's Jolly, an attack was launched at the junctions between the Australian battalions. Achieving a break-in in the centre, they reached the 1st Infantry Brigade's headquarters—which had advanced forward from Brown's Dip following the initial gains—where the brigade commander, Smyth, joined the defence that eventually drove them back. Around midday the Ottomans put in another attack, but this too was repulsed. The positions on the southern Australian flank continued to be subjected to grenading, so the 5th Battalion was brought up to relieve the 7th. The 2nd Battalion, having received a brief respite, also came forward, replacing the 4th Battalion with the support of a dismounted squadron from the 7th Light Horse Regiment. As the fresh units settled in, the Australians prepared for renewed fighting along the line. In the end, the expected attack never came and finally, late in the afternoon of 9 August, the Ottoman commanders called off further attempts to dislodge the Australians. The next day, the fighting "subsided" as both the Ottomans and the Australians worked to consolidate their positions.

Private Victor Laidlaw of the Australian 2nd Field Ambulance wrote on 16 August:

16.8.15 ...looking through the periscope one can see quite well, also plenty of dead bodies can be seen, in fact in the Lonesome Pine Trench which we captured the Turks were lying there 5 feet deep and our fellows had to fight standing on the top of them. Bombs would make a still further mess of the corpses, fleas were there in abundance and beautiful large maggots are beginning to make their appearance, in fact Captain Lind of the 5th Battalion (Medical Officer) had been having some rest when all of a sudden he felt something soft in his trousers, and was horrified to see hundreds of these crawling maggots, needless to say he made a hurried exit from these trenches.

== Aftermath ==
The fighting was "some of the fiercest" the Australians experienced during the campaign to that point. The ground captured during the battle amounted to a total of about 150 metres (160 yd) across a 300-metre (330 yd) front. Amidst scenes of considerable devastation, the Australian divisional commander, Walker, believed the result "disastrous". The higher commanders believed it to have been a tactical success, however, with Hamilton describing it as a "desperate fine feat". Though a tactical victory for the Australians in terms of the fact that they remained in possession of the ground captured, and had managed to draw off some Ottoman reinforcements, nevertheless the wider repercussions of the attack at Lone Pine weighed heavily on the outcome at Chunuk Bair. Sent north to reinforce Lone Pine, due to the effectiveness of the Australian attack, Kannengiesser's 9th Division was directed instead to proceed on to Chunuk Bair where, at the time, there was only one Ottoman artillery battery and a covering force of 20 infantrymen. His force arrived in time to seriously delay the New Zealand attack, and ultimately the wider offensive of which the battle was a part failed. Afterwards, a stalemate situation developed on the Gallipoli peninsula although there were brief periods of localised fighting. In September, the troops of the Australian 1st Division who had taken the position at Lone Pine were relieved by the 23rd and 24th Battalions.

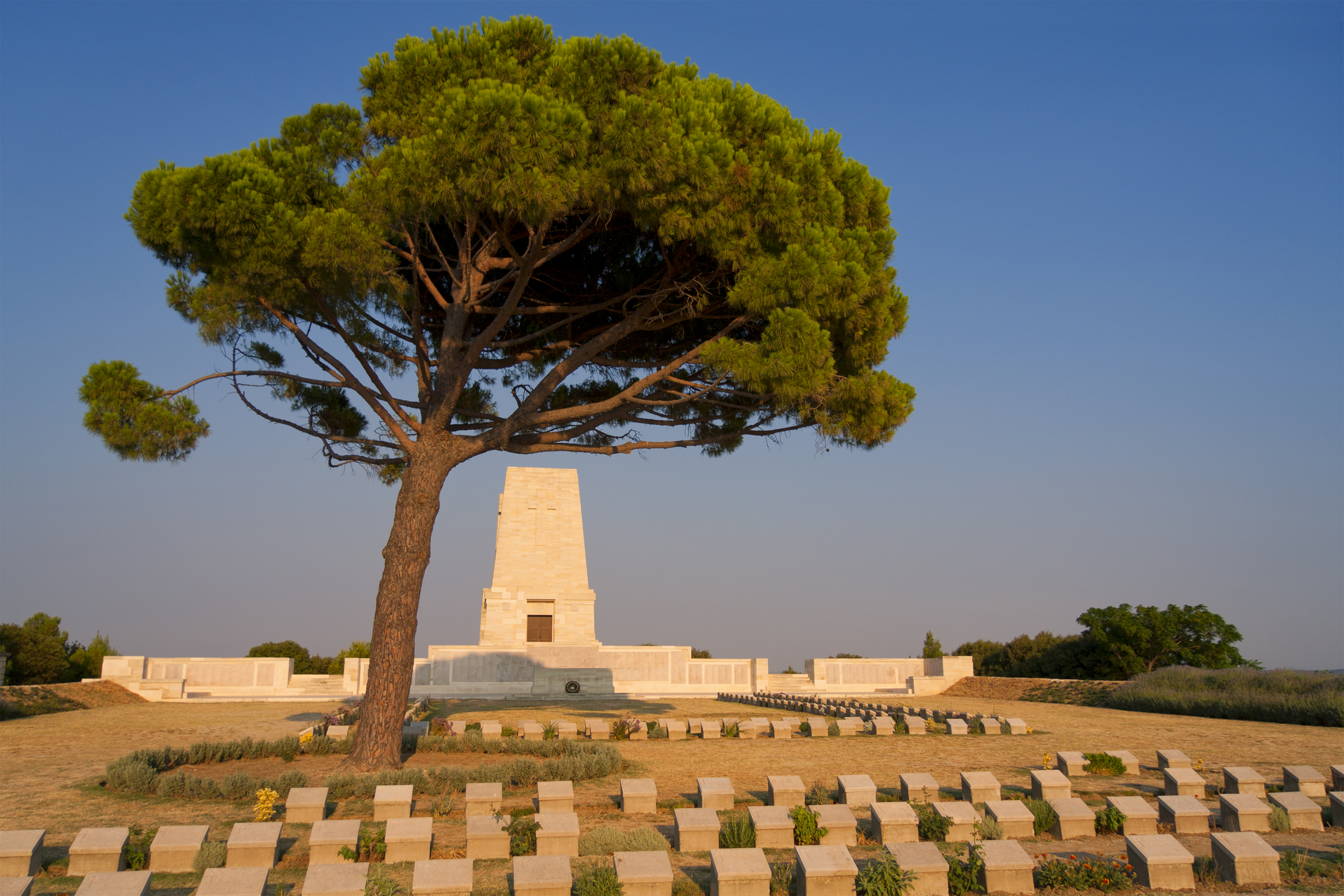
The cemetery at Lone Pine

Dominated by the heights of Baby 700, (Note: Known to the Ottomans as "Kilic Bayir", or "Sword Ridge".) the position was regularly shelled and was subsequently described by one Australian soldier, Trooper Ion Idriess, as "the most dangerous spot" in the Australian lodgement and it ultimately proved a "liability" for the troops tasked with holding it. Opposed by troops from the Ottoman 47th Regiment, for the remaining three months of the campaign, the two Australian battalions would alternate their positions in the front line as the Ottoman and Australians engaged in mining and countermining operations against each other's positions. The stalemate continued as both the Australians and Ottomans lacked the strength to mount a determined attack and this situation ultimately lasted until the Allied evacuation in December 1915.

In most sources, Ottoman losses are estimated at between 5,000–6,000, although Kenan Celik from Çanakkale Onsekiz Mart University, has placed their losses as high as 7,164, broken down as 1,520 killed, 4,700 wounded, 760 listed as missing and 134 captured by the Australians. These included the commanding officers of both the 47th and 15th Regiments. Of the Australian force that had launched the attack, almost half became casualties. Australian losses during the battle amounted to 2,277 men killed or wounded, out of the total 4,600 men committed to the fighting over the course of the battle. These represent some of the highest casualties of the campaign. The toll was particularly heavy amongst the Australian officers; both the commanding officers of the 2nd and 3rd Battalions were killed leading their troops. After the battle, the dead were so thick on the ground that one Australian, Captain Harold Jacobs of the 1st Battalion, remarked "[t]he trench is so full of our dead that the only respect that we could show them was not to tread on their faces, the floor of the trench was just one carpet of them, this in addition to the ones we piled into Turkish dugouts." Later, over 1,000 dead were removed from Australian position to be hastily buried.

Seven Australians were awarded the Victoria Cross for their actions during the fighting at Lone Pine, including four men from the 7th Battalion, which had been rushed forward to help relieve the 1st Brigade at the height of the Ottoman counterattacks. One of the recipients was Corporal William Dunstan, who after the war became the general manager of The Herald newspaper in Melbourne. Another VC recipient was Captain Alfred Shout who had already earned the Military Cross and been Mentioned in Despatches earlier in the Gallipoli campaign. He was mortally wounded at Lone Pine and was later buried at sea. The other VC recipients were Privates Leonard Keysor and John Hamilton, Corporal Alexander Burton and Lieutenants Frederick Tubb and William Symons.

After the war, an Australian military historical mission was sent to Gallipoli, led by Charles Bean. On Bean's advice the Australian government sought permission from the newly formed Turkish Republic to establish an official war cemetery in the area. In 1923 the Treaty of Lausanne was ratified, and through its provisions the Lone Pine cemetery was established in the area, dubbed the Daisy Patch by the Australians. There are a total of 1,167 graves in the cemetery and as of 2012, the identities of 471 bodies interred in the cemetery remain unknown. Also standing within the cemetery's grounds is the Lone Pine memorial. It is the main Australian and New Zealand memorial at Gallipoli and commemorates all the Australian and some of the New Zealanders who died during the campaign, including those who have no known grave and those buried at sea.

As a result of the battle's significance to the Australians, Lone Pine is the site of the annual Australian Anzac Day dawn service at Gallipoli. After the service Australian visitors congregate at the memorial to remember all their countrymen who fought and died at Gallipoli. At the New Zealand National World War I Museum, there is an exhibit for the Battle of Lone Pine, and there is also one in the Australian War Memorial. Memorial "Lone Pine" trees have also been planted in Australia, New Zealand and Gallipoli to commemorate the battle and the Gallipoli campaign in general, seeded from specimens taken from Gallipoli. There are also many places in Australia named after the battle.

== Bibliography ==
- Bean, Charles (1941). The Story of ANZAC from 4 May, 1915, to the Evacuation of the Gallipoli Peninsula. Official History of Australia in the War of 1914–1918. Vol. II (11th ed.). Canberra: Australian War Memorial. OCLC 220898941.
- Broadbent, Harvey (2005). Gallipoli: The Fatal Shore. Camberwell, Victoria: Penguin Group Australia. ISBN 0-670-04085-1.
- Cameron, David (2007). 25 April 1915: The Day the Anzac Legend Was Born. Crows Nest, New South Wales: Allen & Unwin. ISBN 978-1-74114-980-7.
- Cameron, David (2011a). The August Offensive: At ANZAC, 1915. Australian Army Campaigns. Canberra: Army History Unit. ISBN 978-0-9870-5747-1.
- Cameron, David (2011b). Gallipoli: The Final Battles and Evacuation of Anzac. Newport, New South Wales: Big Sky Publishing. ISBN 978-0-9808140-9-5.
- Cameron, David (2012). The Battle for Lone Pine: Four Days of Hell at the Heart of Gallipoli. Camberwell, Victoria: Viking. ISBN 978-0-6700-7629-1.
- Coulthard-Clark, Chris (1998). Where Australians Fought: The Encyclopaedia of Australia's Battles (1st ed.). St Leonards, New South Wales: Allen & Unwin. ISBN 1-86448-611-2.
- Crawley, Rhys (April 2007). "Lone Pine: Worth the Cost?". Wartime (38): 14–17. ISSN 1328-2727.
- Ekins, Ashley (2009). "Bloody Ridge: The Assault of Lone Pine". Wartime (47): 12–14, 16–18. ISSN 1328-2727.
- Fewster, Kevin; Basarin, Vecihi; Basarin, Hatice Hurmuz (2003) [1985]. Gallipoli: The Turkish Story. Crows Nest, New South Wales: Allen & Unwin. ISBN 1-74114-045-5.
- Gray, Andrew (April 2006). "Courage at Lone Pine". Wartime (34): 18–21. ISSN 1328-2727.
- Hawker, J. (1990). "Lone Pine". Conifer Society of Australia Newsletter. 8: 6–7. OCLC 224944593.
- Wahlert, Glenn (2008). Exploring Gallipoli: An Australian Army Battlefield Guide. Campbell, Australian Capital Territory: Army History Unit. ISBN 978-0-9804753-5-7.
