= John Patrick Hamilton =

Recipient of the Victoria Cross (1896–1961)

John Patrick Hamilton VC
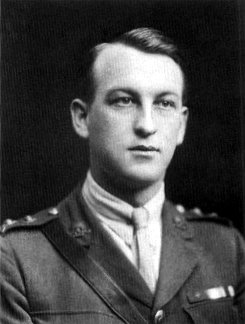
- Lieutenant Hamilton VC, 1919.
- Born: 24 January 1896; Orange, New South Wales
- Died: 27 February 1961 (aged 65); Concord, New South Wales
- Military career
- Allegiance: Australia
- Branch: Australian Army
- Service years: 1914–19; 1940–46
- Rank: Captain
- Unit: 3rd Battalion
- Conflicts: First World War; Gallipoli Campaign; Western Front; Battle of Pozières; Battle of Mouquet Farm; Battle of Passchendaele; Second World War; New Guinea campaign
- Awards: Victoria Cross

John Patrick Hamilton, VC (24 January 1896 – 27 February 1961) was an Australian recipient of the Victoria Cross, the highest award for gallantry in the face of the enemy that can be awarded to British and Commonwealth forces.

== Early life ==
Born in Orange, New South Wales, Hamilton described himself as a butcher when he enlisted aged eighteen, as a private in the 1st Australian Imperial Force on 15 September 1914. His father William Hamilton was also a butcher and they resided together in Penshurst, Sydney when the younger Hamilton joined up. He was assigned to the 3rd Battalion (N.S.W.) and embarked from Sydney in October 1914 on HMAT Euripides. After training in Egypt his battalion sailed for Gallipoli and took part in the landing at Anzac Cove on 25 April 1915 – his battalion coming ashore in the second and third waves.

== First World War ==
Private John Patrick Hamilton VC Memorial in Orange

Hamilton was 19 years old, and still a private when the following deed took place at Sasse's Sap during the Battle of Lone Pine on the Gallipoli Peninsula for which he was awarded the VC:

For most conspicuous bravery on 9th August, 1915, in the Gallipoli Peninsula. During a heavy bomb attack by the enemy on the newly captured position at Lone Pine, Private Hamilton, with utter disregard to personal safety, exposed himself under heavy fire on the parados, in order to secure a better fire position against the enemy's bomb throwers. His coolness and daring example had an immediate effect. The defence was encouraged, and the enemy driven off with heavy loss

The 3rd Battalion was decimated at Lone Pine but, after the withdrawal from Gallipoli and reorganization in Egypt the Battalion was redeployed to the Western Front in March 1916 and went into the line at Armentières. Hamilton was promoted corporal on 3 May and fought at the Battle of Pozières in July, the Battle of Mouquet Farm in August and Flers in November. He was promoted sergeant in May 1917 and that year his battalion served at Bullecourt and at the Menin Road and Broodseinde theatres of the Battle of Passchendale.

After officer cadet training at Cambridge, England, from July 1918 he was commissioned a second lieutenant in January 1919 and promoted lieutenant in April 1919. After demobilisation, he was discharged in September 1919.

== Second World War ==
Hamilton rejoined the Army in 1940, and served as a lieutenant with the 16th Garrison Battalion and several training battalions. In 1942 he went to New Guinea with the 2/3rd Pioneer Battalion, then served with Australian Labour Employment Companies until 1944 when he transferred to the Australian Army Labour Service. He was promoted captain in the Australian Military Forces in October 1944. He returned to Sydney in April 1946.

== Between and post the wars ==
He was a wharf labourer for over thirty years, also working as a shipping clerk, storeman and packer. He was an active in the Waterside Workers' Federation and in the Sydney branch of the Australian Labor Party.

Hamilton died of cerebro-vascular disease in the Concord Repatriation General Hospital on 27 February 1961 and is buried in Woronora cemetery. His Victoria Cross is displayed at the Australian War Memorial and was the only one awarded to Hamilton's unit during the war.

== Honours and awards ==

	Victoria Cross (VC)
	1914–15 Star
	British War Medal
	Victory Medal
	1939–1945 Star
	Pacific Star
	War Medal 1939–1945
	Australia Service Medal 1939–45
Ribbon of the King George VI Coronation Medal	King George VI Coronation Medal
Ribbon of the Queen Elizabeth II Coronation Medal	Queen Elizabeth II Coronation Medal

The life-size bronze statue of Private John Patrick Hamilton who received the Victoria Cross (VC) for his bravery at the Battle of Lone Pine in the First World War, was unveiled on 21 April 2017 outside Orange’s former Town Hall.
