= Leonard Keysor =

Recipient of the Victoria Cross

Leonard Keysor VC
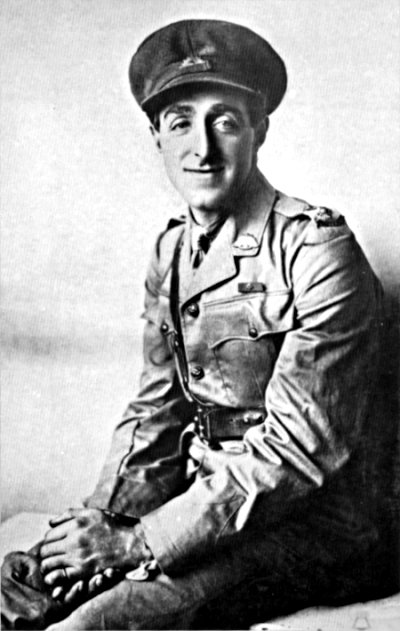
- Lieutenant Leonard Keysor c. 1917
- Born: 3 November 1885; Maida Vale, London, England
- Died: 12 October 1951 (aged 65); Paddington, London, England
- Military career
- Allegiance: Australia
- Branch: Australian Imperial Force
- Service years: 1914–18
- Rank: Lieutenant
- Units: 1st Battalion; 42nd Battalion
- Conflicts: First World War; Gallipoli Campaign; Battle of Lone Pine; Western Front; Battle of the Somme; Battle of Pozières; Second Battle of Villers-Bretonneux
- Awards: Victoria Cross

Leonard Maurice Keysor, VC (also known as "Keyzor" or "Kyezor") (3 November 1885 – 12 October 1951) was a British-born Australian recipient of the Victoria Cross, the highest award for gallantry "in the face of the enemy" that can be awarded to British and Commonwealth forces. Born in England, Keysor emigrated to Australia shortly before the outbreak of the First World War. He enlisted in the First Australian Imperial Force in August 1914 and served in Egypt before landing at Gallipoli, Turkey at the beginning of the campaign. On 7 August 1915 at Lone Pine, while serving as an acting lance-corporal, 29-year-old Keysor performed an act of bravery for which he was awarded the Victoria Cross. Later in the war he took part in the fighting in France, serving in the trenches along the Western Front. He would later achieve the rank of lieutenant before being discharged from the army on medical grounds at the end of the war.

Keysor remained in Australia until early 1919 working as a clerk in Sydney, New South Wales before returning to England where he began a career in business. On the outbreak of the Second World War he attempted to rejoin the military but was deemed medically unfit and was rejected. He died in 1951 suffering from cancer.

== Early life ==
Leonard Maurice Keysor was born Leonard Maurice Kyezor on 3 November 1885 in Maida Vale, London. He was the third of five children of Benjamin Kyezor, a Jewish clock importer, and Julia Benjamin. Keysor was educated at Townley Castle in Ramsgate. After completing his studies, Keysor travelled to Canada in 1904 where he remained for a period of ten years before emigrating to Australia in 1914 where his brother Stanley and sister Madge were living. He undertook clerical work in Sydney, New South Wales. He was the cousin of British actress and comedienne, Rita Webb.

== Military career ==
Keysor had only been in Australia for about three months when the First World War broke out. He enlisted in the Australian Imperial Force on 18 August 1914 as a private and was assigned to the 1st Battalion, which was forming at Randwick. On 18 October 1914 he embarked for overseas service among the first contingent. Initially he served in Egypt where the Australians were involved in the defence of the Suez Canal against the Turks, but on 25 April 1915, he landed at Gallipoli where he took part in the subsequent fighting on the peninsula. On 20 June 1915 he was promoted to lance corporal, before taking part in the Battle of Lone Pine in August.

It was during the course of this battle that Keysor performed the actions that led to him receiving the Victoria Cross. Early in the morning on 6 August 1915 the 1st Battalion carried out a diversionary attack at Lone Pine and after heavy fighting that lasted almost the entire day they managed to capture the Turkish trenches. After this more fighting would continue around the position for the next three days as the Turks attempted to regain the position. The fighting was carried out at close range, using bayonets and improvised grenades and bombs. Over the course of about 50 hours on 7–8 August, Keysor continually risked his life to pick up the Turkish grenades as they were thrown into the trenches and throw them back. Later, despite being wounded and ordered to seek medical attention, Keysor continued to remain in the line, volunteering to throw bombs for another company.

After the battle was over Keysor was evacuated from Gallipoli suffering enteric fever. He eventually rejoined the 1st Battalion after they had been transferred to France in early 1916. In March 1916 Keysor took part in the Battle of Pozières. In November 1916 he was transferred to the 42nd Battalion and promoted to the rank of sergeant on 1 December. On 13 January 1917 he was commissioned and promoted to the rank of second lieutenant. Six months later he was promoted to lieutenant. On 28 March 1918 Keysor was wounded and was evacuated from the line before returning to take part in the fighting at Villers-Bretonneux, where he was gassed on 26 May 1918.

In October 1918 when manpower levels in the AIF reached critical level, Keysor returned to Australia to head up a recruiting campaign. He was discharged from the army on medical grounds on 12 December 1918.

== Historical Marker of Honour - London ==
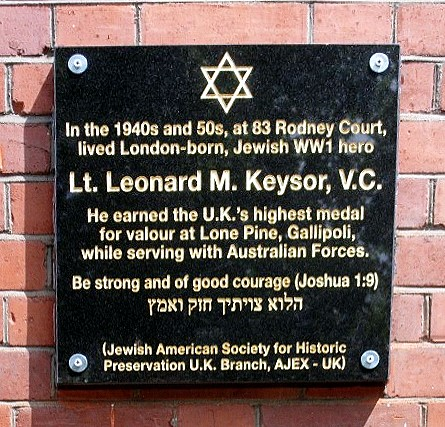
Lt. Leonard M. Keysor, V.C.

2025, A historical marker of honour was placed in London by the Jewish American Society for Historic Preservation, U.K. Branch and AJEX-U.K.

== Later life ==
Following the end of the war, Keysor resided in Sydney from 1918 until February 1919 during which time he worked as a clerk when he returned to England. On 8 July 1920 he married Gladys Benjamin. After this he went into the family business importing clocks.

In 1927 Keysor re-enacted his exploits at Gallipoli in the film For Valour, during which he was injured. He remained on the Australian Military Forces list of inactive reserve officers, however, in 1939 when the Second World War began Keysor attempted to rejoin the military, but was rejected on medical grounds.

He died of cancer in Paddington, London, on 12 October 1951 and was cremated at Golders Green Crematorium. He was survived by his wife and their daughter Joan. In 1977 Keysor's Victoria Cross was purchased by the Returned Services League. It is now displayed at the Australian War Memorial in Canberra.

In Australia in September 2014 his great niece Keira Quinn Lockyer published his biography "Kyezor VC, Gallipoli's Quiet Hero".

== Medals ==

Victoria Cross (VC)
1914–15 Star
British War Medal
Victory Medal (UK)

== Bibliography ==
- Snelling, Stephen (2012) [1995]. Gallipoli. VCs of the First World War. The History Press. ISBN 978-0752456539.
