= Anzac Square Building =

Heritage-listed building in Brisbane, Queensland

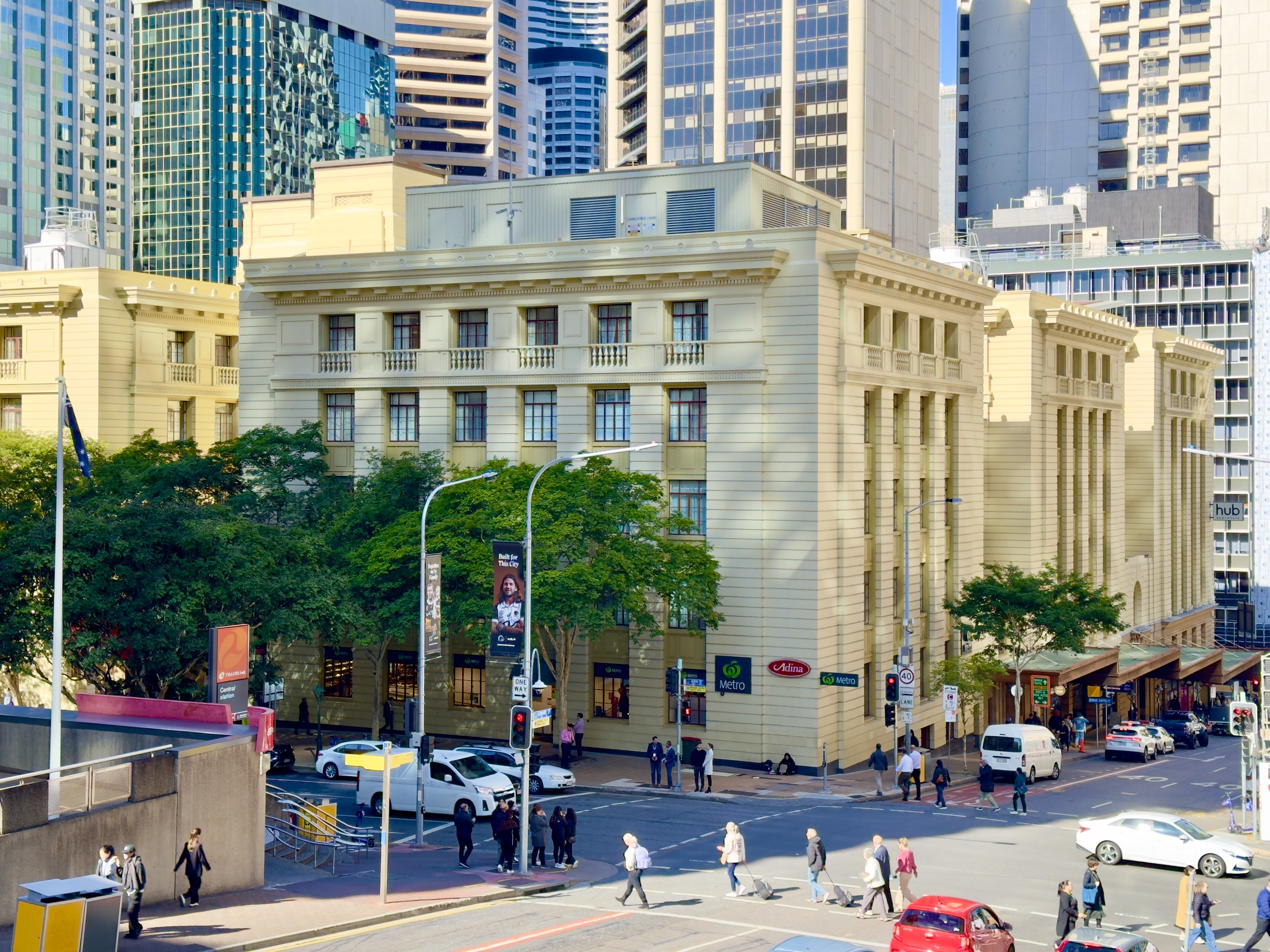
- Anzac Square Building, corner of Edward and Adelaide Street, 2024

- Location within Queensland Location within Australia
- 27.4669°S 153.0261°E
- Location: 255A Ann Street, Brisbane City, City of Brisbane, Queensland, Australia

History
- Design period: 1919–1930s (interwar period)
- Built: 1931–1959

Site notes
- Architect: John Smith Murdoch
- Architectural style: Classicism

Queensland Heritage Register
- Official name: Former Queensland Government Offices (Anzac Square Building), Adina Hotels, State Government Offices/The Murdoch Apartments/Hotel
- Type: state heritage (built)
- Designated: 21 October 1992
- Reference no.: 600059
- Significant period: 1930s–1950s (fabric); 1930s–1990s (historical)
- Builders: A H Mason

Anzac Square Building is a heritage-listed office building at 255A Ann Street, Brisbane City, City of Brisbane, Queensland, Australia. It was designed by John Smith Murdoch and built from 1931 to 1959 by A H Mason. It is also known as Queensland Government Offices, State Government Offices, Adina Apartments Hotel, and Murdoch Apartments & Hotel. It was added to the Queensland Heritage Register on 21 October 1992.

== History ==
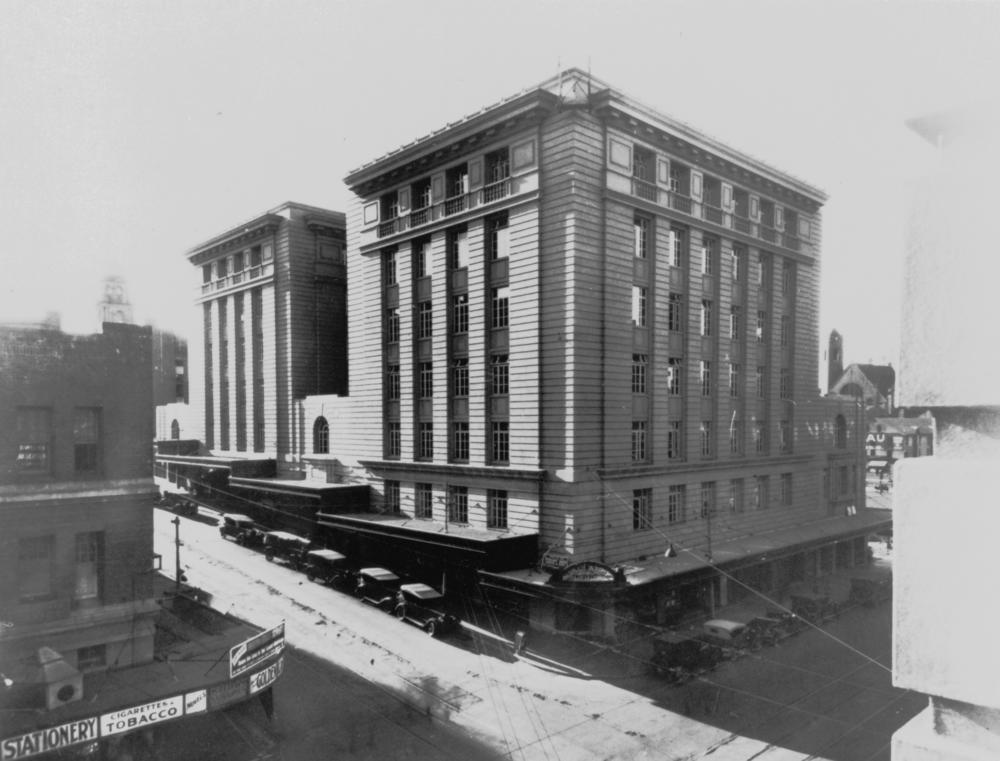
State Government Building (now Anzac Square Building), Brisbane, 1933

The Queensland Government Offices were built in stages commencing in 1931 and completed by 1959. It forms an integral part of the design by John Smith Murdoch, Chief Architect of the Commonwealth, for the block bounded by Edward, Ann, Creek and Adelaide Streets and consisting of separate state and federal government offices flanking a memorial square.

Prior to the construction of the Queensland Government Offices the site was occupied by the old Normal School, near the Edward and Adelaide Streets corner, and a fire station at the corner of Edward and Ann Streets. The land for the Normal School was originally granted in 1852 to the Board for National Education. Further grants were made to the Board of General Education in 1861. The Normal School opened in 1863. The school acquired more land along the Ann Street frontage in 1871 but in 1889 the allotment at the corner of Ann and Edward Streets was dedicated for a Fire Brigade Station Reserve. A fire station, designed by Henry Wallace Atkinson, was built in 1890.

The Commonwealth Government owned much of the remaining part of the block. Around 1910 it was investigating a proposal to create a square in front of the Central Railway Station that would serve as a fitting entrance to the city. The idea of a square dedicated to the memory of the Anzacs was first raised soon after the Gallipoli campaign in 1916. A committee was formed in 1919 by Lt Col Donald Charles Cameron to lobby for the creation of a commemorative square that would occupy the entire block. In 1921 the Commonwealth Standing Committee on Public Works decided to erect a National War Memorial as part of the redevelopment of the block.

In 1923 John Smith Murdoch proposed a layout for the block which included a central square flanked by rectangular office blocks of similar appearance. An alternative design was produced by the former Deputy Government Architect Lt Col T Pye later in the same year. This scheme, featuring a semicircular drive with triangular planned offices in the northern and western corners of the site, was sent to the federal government for consideration.

Murdoch subsequently sent three alternative designs to the Brisbane City Council and the State Public Works Department. One of these was adopted to coordinate the design of the block. Design guidelines were established allowing for the construction of seven storeyed buildings consisting of a two storeyed base faced in granite and sandstone and upper walls of brick or concrete rendered to imitate stone. Detailed design and documentation of the Queensland Government Offices was carried out by the Architectural Branch of the Queensland Public Works Department, in accordance with the guidelines, under the supervision of Andrew Baxter Leven. Elevations were designed to match the proposed Commonwealth Government Offices.

By 1928 land in the centre of the block, with frontages to Ann and Adelaide Streets of 228 feet (69 m), was dedicated for the purpose of public park under the control of Brisbane City Council. A national competition held in 1928 to design the Anzac memorial and square was won by Sydney architects Buchanan and Cowper. By 1929 the designs of Anzac Square and the Queensland Government Offices had been finalised. Anzac Square was opened in 1930.

The Normal School and adjacent Army Drill shed were demolished by 1930. The site was excavated at the corner of Edward and Adelaide Streets in preparation for the first stage of construction of the new Queensland Government Offices; Units 1 and 2. In the final design a two storeyed podium formed the base for six five storeyed towers connected by a corridor which wrapped around a central courtyard. Each tower block constituted a unit. Eighteen tenders were received on 25 March 1931 for the construction of Units 1, located in the centre of the Edward Street facade and Unit 2, on the Edward and Adelaide Streets corner.

The lowest tenderer, AH Mason with a price of £193,844/13/- , was accepted on 14 April 1931. The contract time was two years. Emphasis was placed on the use, where possible, of local products in line with the government's "Queensland Made" policy. Timbers such as silky oak, Queensland satiny, rose walnut, yellow wood ash, rose mahogany, maple and walnut bean were incorporated into the designs for parquetry flooring and wall panelling in the various offices. Many of the public spaces were lined with marble supplied by the Ulam Quarries near Rockhampton. Services in the new building included lifts, intercommunicating telephone systems, pneumatic despatch tube system, mechanical ventilation and vacuum-cleaning system. Units 1 and 2 were occupied by the Public Curator and the State Government Insurance Office in June 1933.

Construction of Unit 3 commenced in 1934, using day labour, and was finished by 1937. The design took advantage of the street frontages in Units 1, 2 and 3 by including small shops and an arcade on the ground floors of the Edward and Adelaide Street elevations (now known as ANZAC Square Arcade).

During 1940/41 approval was given to proceed with the construction of the fourth unit. This unit, located in the centre of the Anzac Square frontage, was to accommodate the Titles Office, Stamp Duties Office, State Advances Corporation and Bureau of Rural Development. Despite a pressing need for office accommodation, work was stopped due to war induced shortages of materials, especially steel. In 1944 the exposed steel frame was encased in concrete and a concrete floor was poured to provide weather protection for the frame. Construction proceeded slowly and Unit 4 was not finished and fully occupied until 1948.

Tenders were called during 1948 for the final stage of the building, Units 5 and 6 on Ann Street. The contract was let but it was not expected to be finished for two years due to shortages. The fire station was demolished in 1950 and the site excavated. Work halted in 1952 due to restrictions of Loans Funds. Building recommenced in 1954 and was completed by 1960.

Work on the Commonwealth offices commenced in 1934 and 2 units were completed and occupied by 1936. No more work was done on the project. In 1968 at the request of the Commonwealth government both the State Government and the Brisbane City Council, as trustee of the square, agreed to abandon the design covenants governing the block and a fifteen-storey office building was constructed on the corner of Creek and Ann Streets.

During the 1970s a number of redevelopment schemes were proposed by the Brisbane City Council for Anzac Square but were not built. The Queensland Government Offices underwent a major refurbishment in the early 1980s when many of the original interior fittings, including the timber paneling and flooring, were removed or concealed. In the mid 1980s raised walkways were constructed across Anzac Square which partly obscure the view of the adjoining facade of the Queensland Government Offices.

A private consortium redeveloped the Anzac Square Building c. 2000 to convert it to a more mixed use with:

- 41 residential apartments
- five floors of office space
- an apartment hotel with 135 rooms
- a shopping arcade with 35 shops (known as Anzac Square Arcade)

The redevelopment won numerous awards for urban renewal and refurbishment.

== Description ==
The Queensland Government Offices is a seven storeyed masonry and steel structure containing offices and ground level shops. Situated at the south western end of the block bounded by Ann, Edward, Adelaide and Creek Streets, the building forms an integral part of a design which includes a memorial square and offices for the Commonwealth Government. The square is part of a larger open space which links the Central Railway Station and the GPO.

The building consists of the repetition of six units of similar design around a central courtyard. The lower two storeys form a podium built to the property alignment. The podium is faced in Helidon sandstone with a granite base. The five upper levels are divided into six towers each separated from the next by deep recessed bays which act as light courts. The external brick walls of the upper levels are channelled and rendered to resemble the banded sandstone of the podium. The steel frame of the building supports the walls which are not loadbearing.

The building has repetitive facades which are articulated vertically and horizontally. Vertically they are divided into base, middle and top. Horizontally the longer Edward Street and Anzac Square facades are divided into three by the recesses which form light courts while the Adelaide and Ann Street facades are divided into two. Towers located at the rear of the light recesses protrude above the general parapet level. The composition of the facades is emphasised by the restrained use of classical detail. A moulded projection marks the junction between podium and middle levels. The upper level features classical balustrading and cornice. The middle and upper levels are a lighter colour than the base with the exception of the spandrel panels under the windows. The darker colour and slight recessing of the spandrel panels causes the spaces between the windows to appear as simplified pilasters.

Wrapping around two thirds of the Edward Street and all of the Adelaide Street facades is a steel framed copper sheeted awning. The awning steps down the Edward Street elevation following the slope of the pavement. It is supported on metal tie rods and has pressed decoration including a coffered ceiling, rosettes and acanthus leaf friezes.

In the centre of the Edward Street facade on the street level is a shopping arcade which is also an entrance to the building. The arcade has mosaic tiled floor with patterned border, a coffered plaster ceiling and timber and glass shop fronts. Two more entrances are located on this elevation. Double timber doors, positioned below the recesses between each unit, open onto long corridors leading to small lift foyers.

A vehicle entrance with ornamental cast iron gates is located on the ground level of the Adelaide Street facade. It leads to the central courtyard. Flanking this entrance are two pedestrian entrances which lead via corridors to lift foyers. The main foyer space in the building is on the northern side of the vehicular access and features a grand staircase leading to the first floor level. Most of the remainder of the Adelaide and Edward Street facades at ground level is occupied by shops. Original shop fronts have plate glass windows with copper clad glazing bars and timber panelling.

There are two entrances from Anzac Square. These are similar to the entrances from Edward Street and are located between each unit.

The site originally sloped steeply from Ann Street down to Adelaide Street and was excavated to create a flat platform. The Ann Street facade is five storeys, with a further two storeys and a mezzanine located below pavement level. In the centre of this facade is a prominent arched portal. This entrance is faced in smooth sandstone and its simplified modern design, without mouldings or banding, contrasts with the external finishes of the remainder of the building.

All of the building's entrances lead to the middle of the building where they are connected by a main corridor which wraps around the central courtyard. Vertical circulation is via stairs and lifts along the main corridor.

Although most of the office spaces have been altered since construction, the public spaces of the building retain their original finishes. These interiors are enriched by the use of simplified classically derived ornament and richly patterned materials. The foyers and hallways on the lower levels feature marble panelling on the walls, and black and white mosaic tiles on the floors with black marble skirtings. Staircases, columns and pilasters are also of marble. On the upper levels terrazzo is used instead of marble. The staircases have cast iron balustrades with timber handrails and marble or terrazzo treads. Steel casement windows are used throughout with the exception of Units 3 and 4 which have timber casements. Internal walls are generally double brick with a rendered finish. The former caretakers flat located on the roof is of lightweight construction with a corrugated iron roof.

The external walls of the central courtyard are rendered and painted. At each level above the ground are two concrete balconies with simple metal handrails which cantilever into the courtyard.

== Heritage listing ==
Anzac Square Building was listed on the Queensland Heritage Register on 21 October 1992 having satisfied the following criteria.

The place is important in demonstrating the evolution or pattern of Queensland's history.

The building is an integral part of a larger design, the conception and execution of which involved the cooperative efforts of three tiers of government.

The building is representative of the policies and priorities of the Queensland Government of the 1920s and 1930s, having a strong association with the "Queensland Made" ethic and daylabouring employment schemes. Its long period of construction demonstrates the commitment of successive state governments to the completion of an ambitious and unified undertaking. The staging of the construction is evident in the form of the building, clearly divided into six units.

The place is important in demonstrating the principal characteristics of a particular class of cultural places.

Anzac Square and the adjoining Queensland and Commonwealth Government Offices constitutes the most important Queensland example of the Anzac memorial movement and shows the extent of the monumentalism of this national building program. The architecture of this group demonstrates the formality and solemnity deemed necessary to commemorate the sacrifice of Australian soldiers in war. This aesthetic, drawn from the western classical tradition, was considered consistent with the expression of the functions of government.

It is a prominent example of large public building designed in the 1920s, which has been in continuing use as shops and government offices since construction.

The place is important because of its aesthetic significance.

The building, through its restrained style, imposing bulk, symmetrical composition and judicious use of classical detail, is consistent with and contributes to the aesthetic qualities of Anzac square and the Commonwealth Government Offices.

The place has a special association with the life or work of a particular person, group or organisation of importance in Queensland's history.

The building is a major example of the work of the nationally important architect John Smith Murdoch and an example of the high quality of design and construction achieved by the Queensland Works Department under Andrew Baxter Leven, especially the external facades and the internal public spaces which have been little altered since first built.
