= ANZAC Square Arcade =

Shopping centre in Brisbane, Australia

Coordinates: 27°28′01″S 153°01′34″E

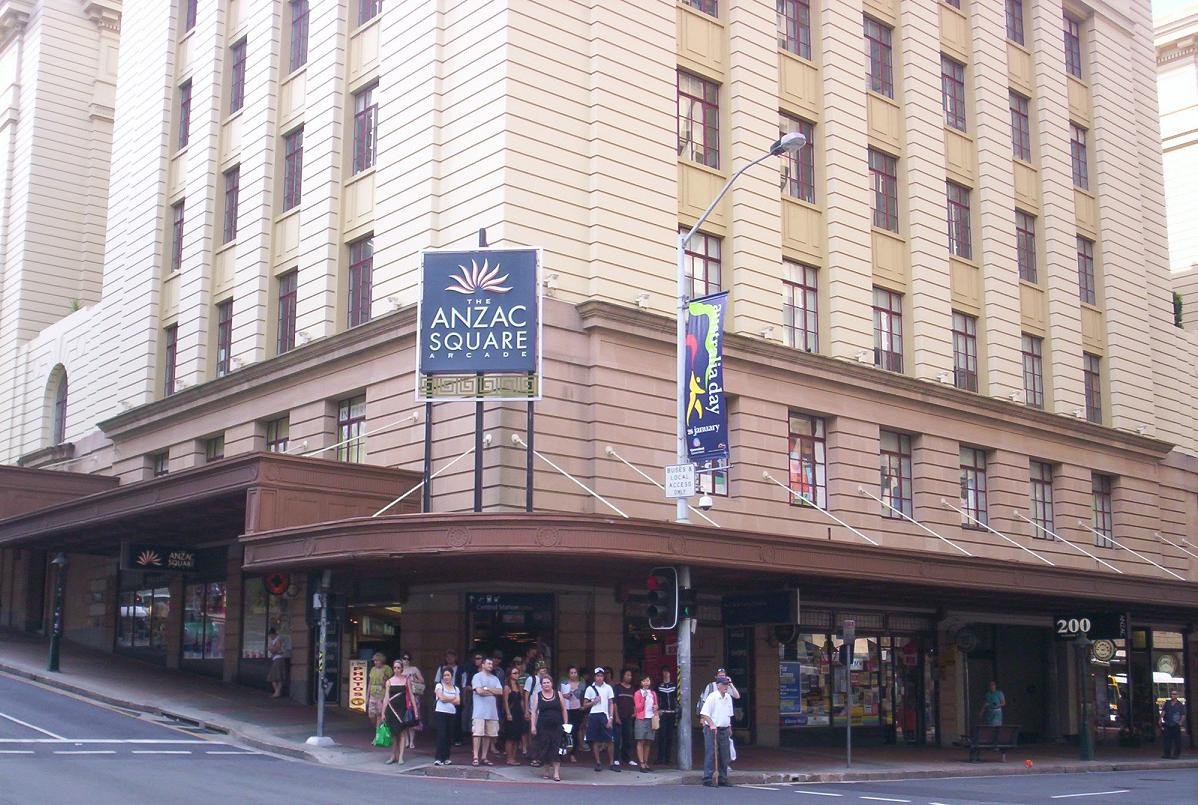
ANZAC Square Arcade

ANZAC Square Arcade is a shopping centre in Brisbane, Queensland, Australia. It is within the Anzac Square Building on the corner of Edward Street and Adelaide Street, adjacent to ANZAC Square from which it derives its name. The building is diagonally opposite QueensPlaza.

ANZAC Square Arcade has a number of specialty shops, a pharmacy, a dental surgery and a food court.

It has access to Central Station, and Queensland Rail City network timetables are displayed within the arcade.

== Gallery ==
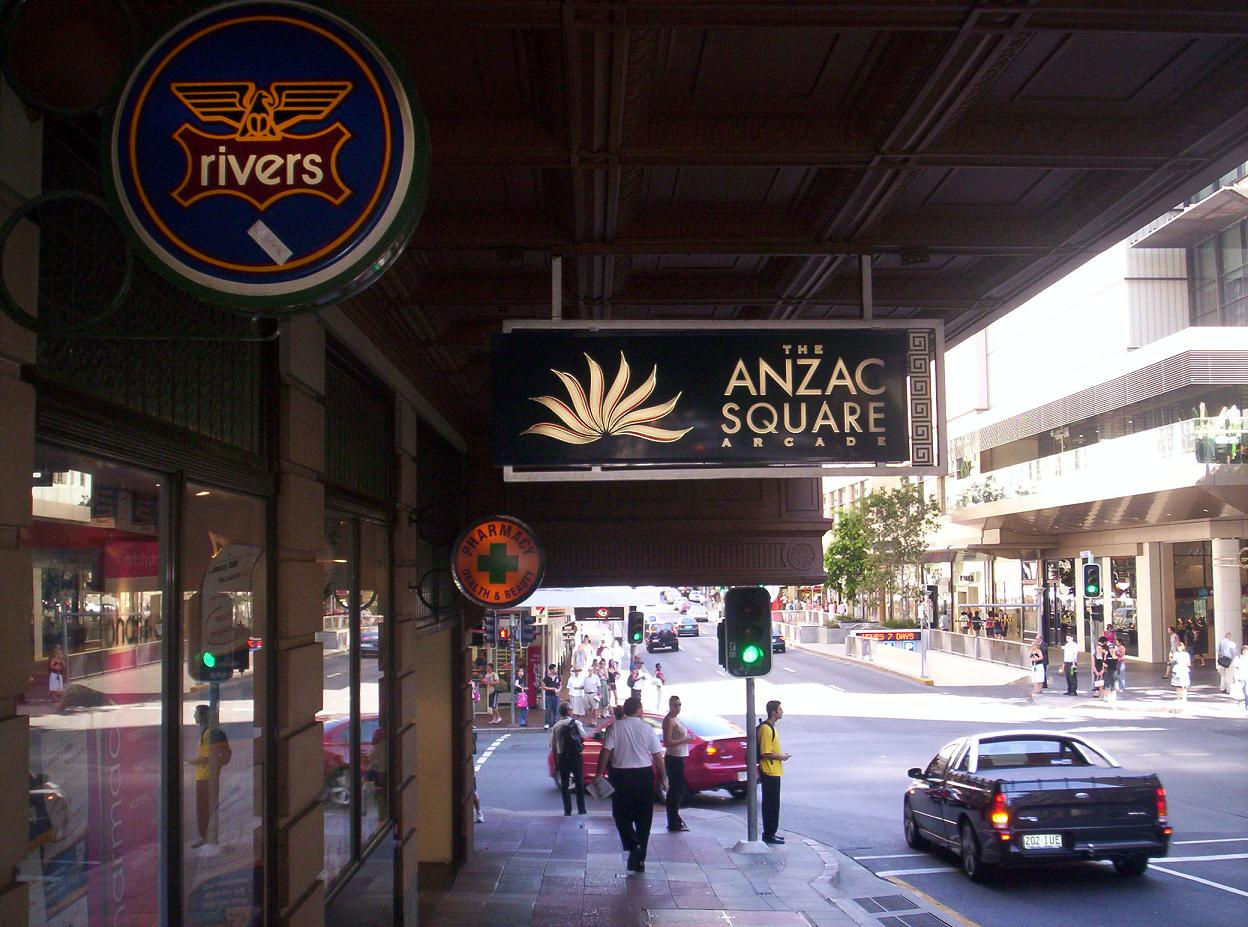
ANZAC Square Arcade – (Edward Street – looking towards Adelaide Street)

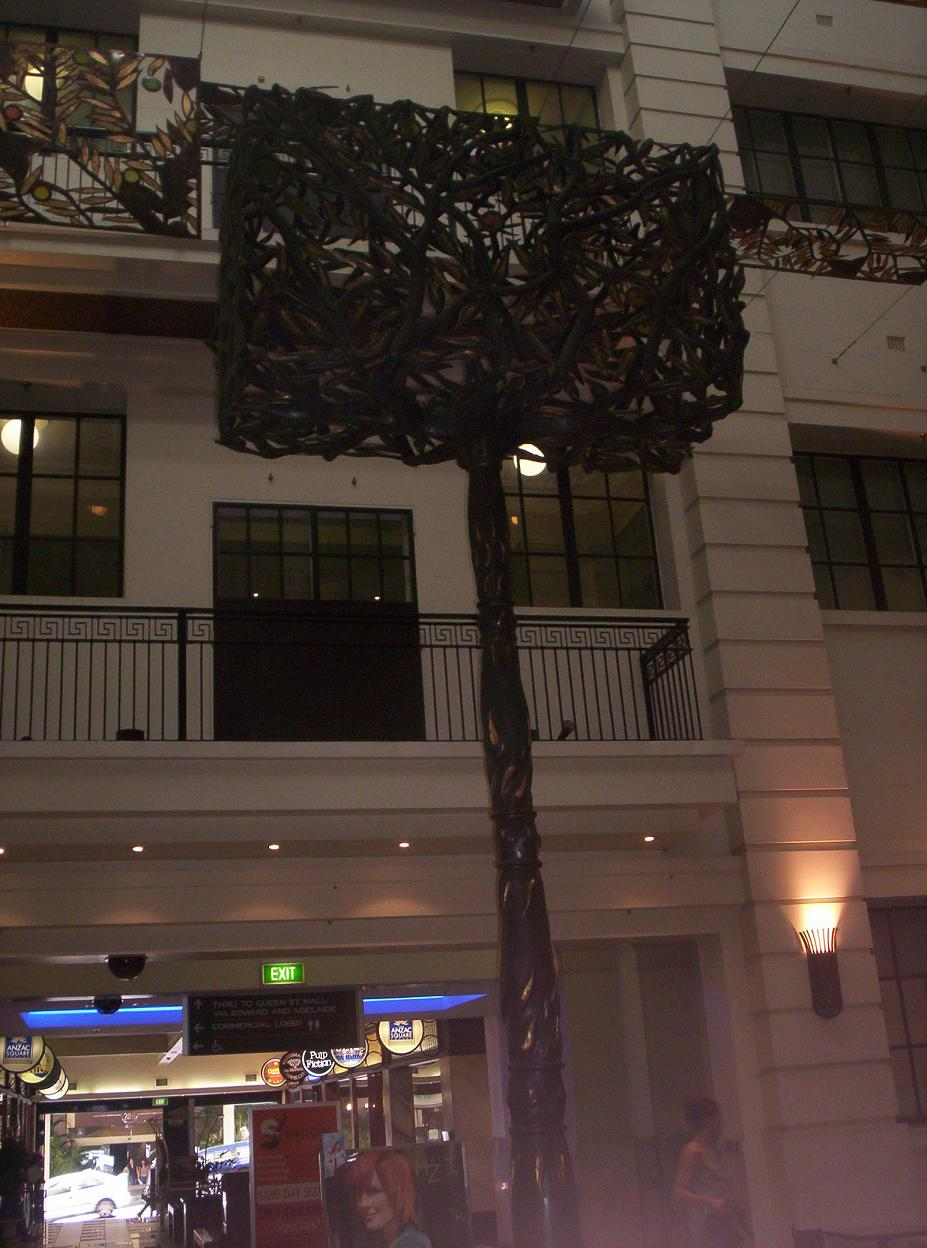
Inside ANZAC Square Arcade

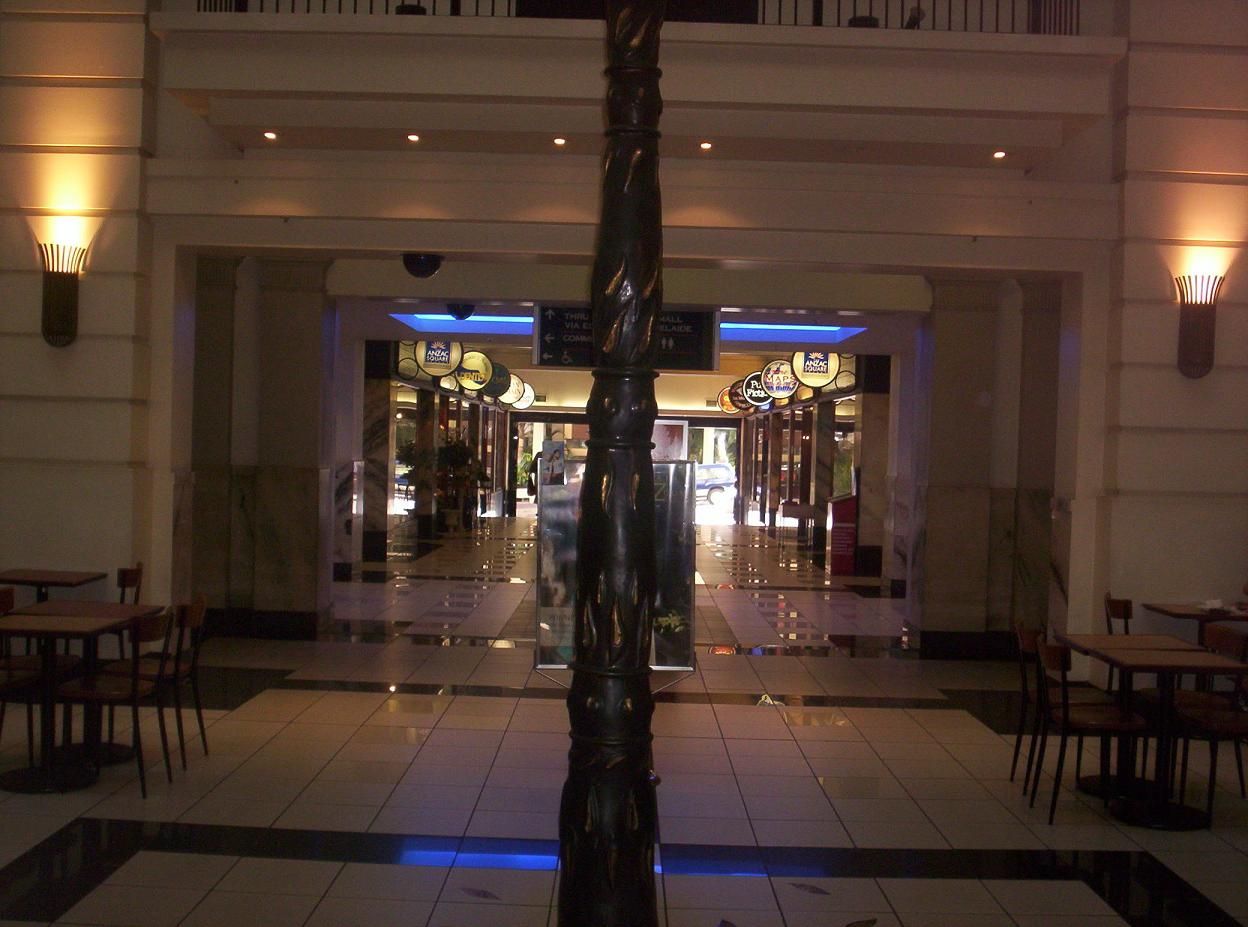
Inside ANZAC Square Arcade

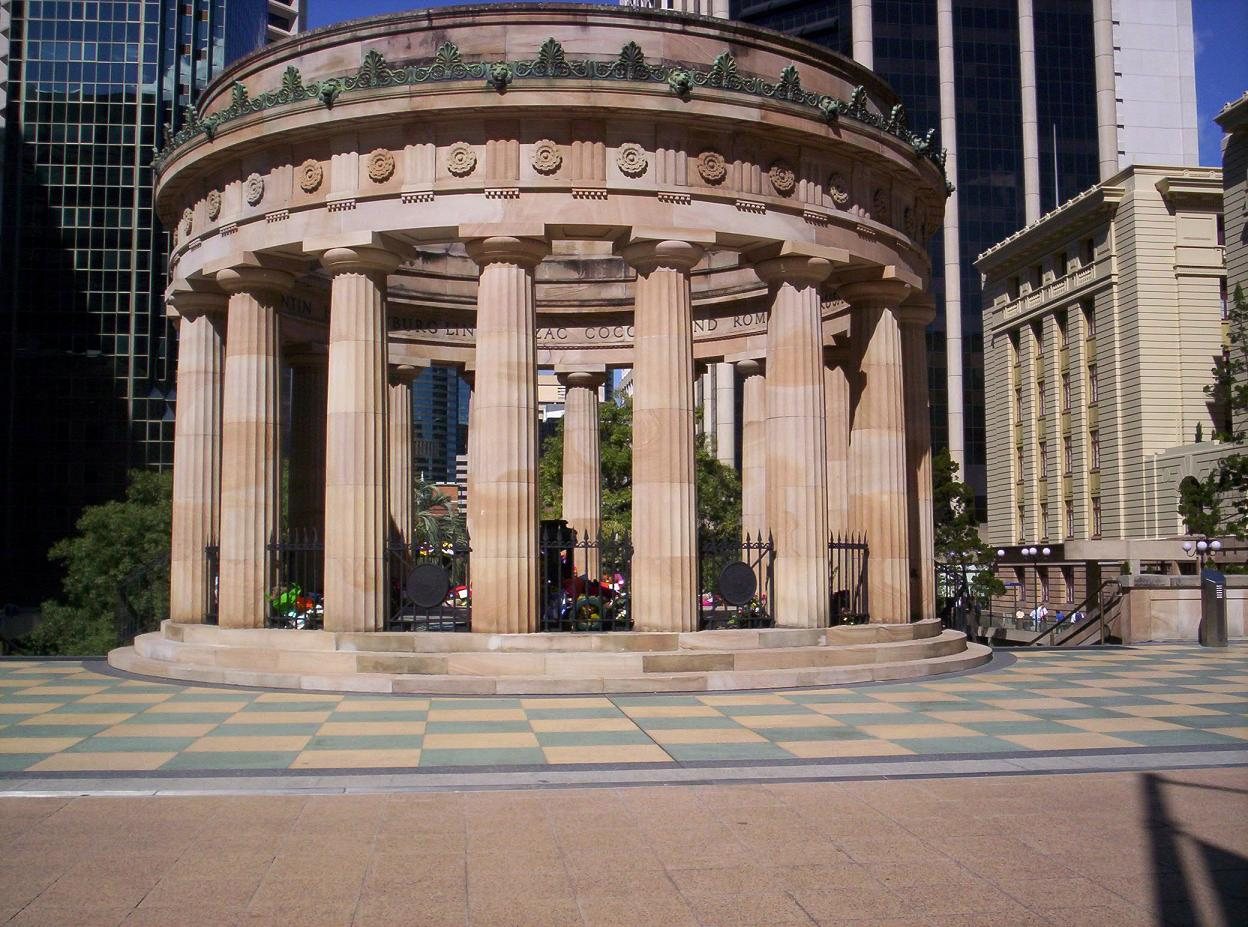
Shrine of Remembrance – (ANZAC Square Arcade can be seen at right side of image)

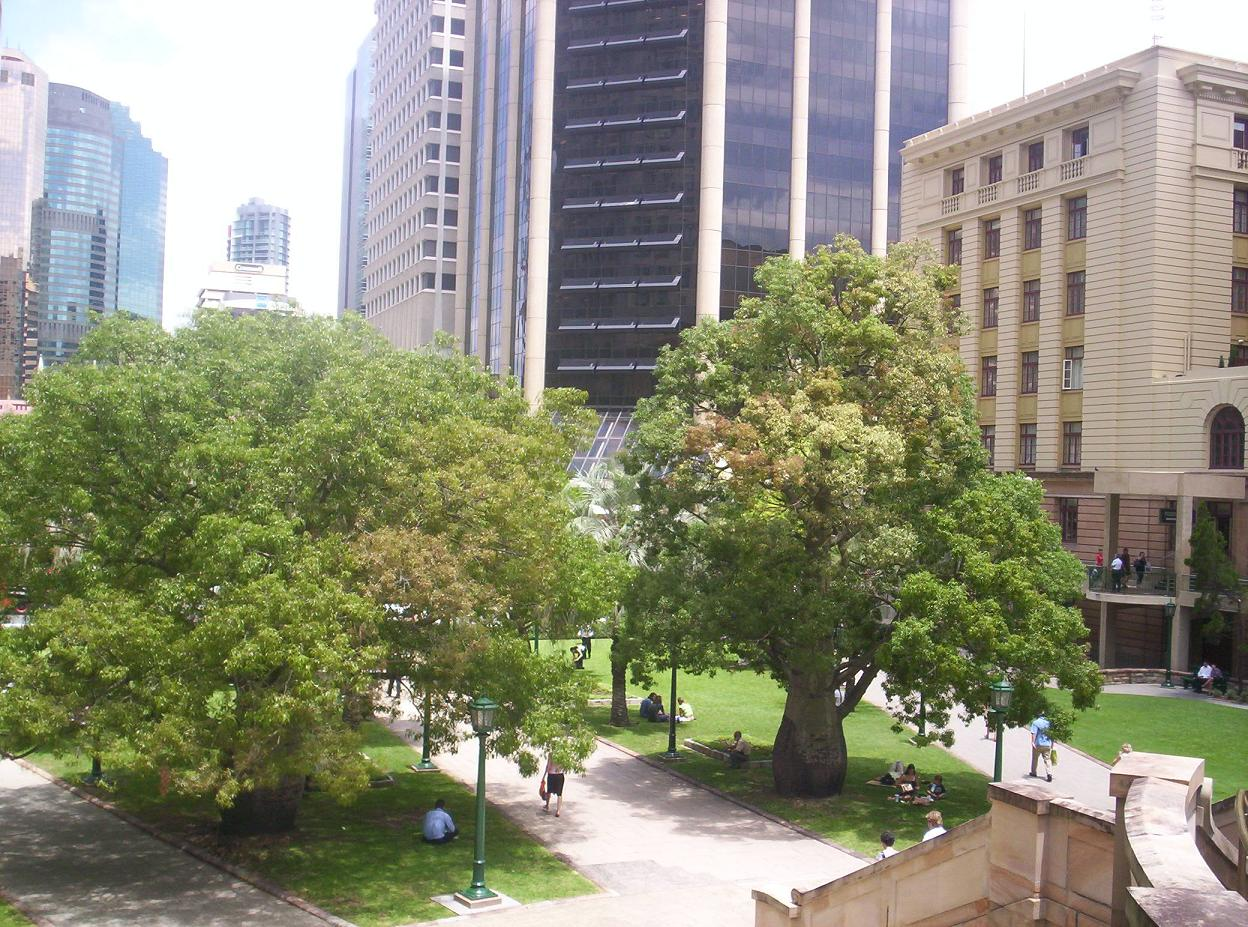
ANZAC Square – showing Anzac Square Arcade at right side of image

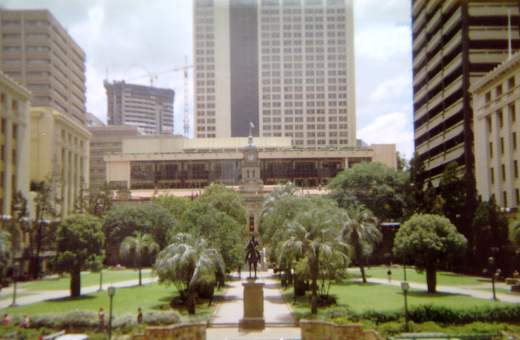
ANZAC Square – showing Anzac Square Arcade at left side of image
