= Hotel Kurrajong =

Hotel in Canberra, Australia

Hotel Kurrajong Canberra
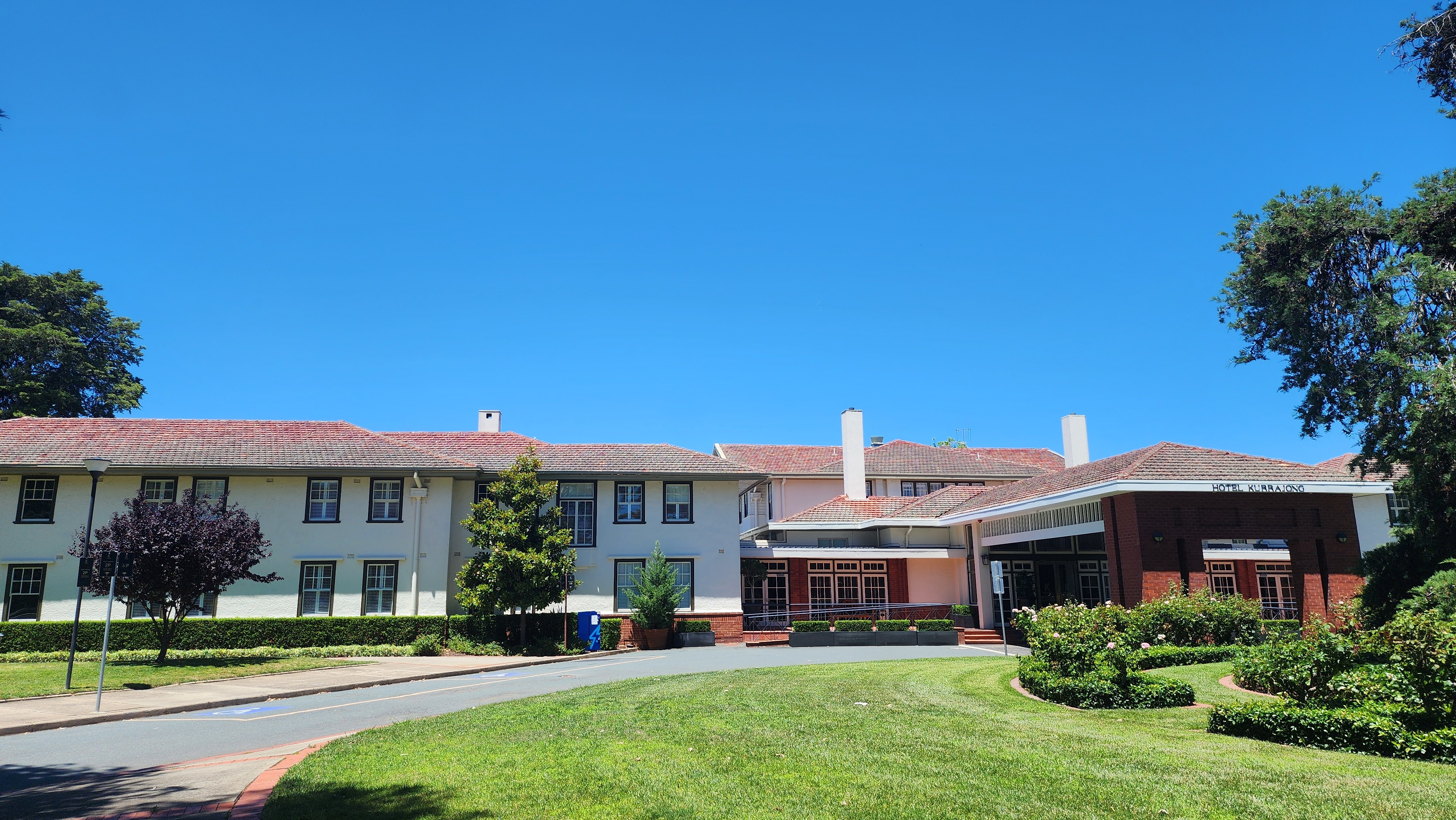

General information
- Location: 8 National Cct; Barton, Australian Capital Territory
- Coordinates: 35.30748°S 149.13438°E
- Opening: 1926
- Owner: TFE Hotels/NRMA
- Operator: TFE Hotels (Australia)

Technical details
- Floor count: 2

Design and construction
- Architect: John Smith Murdoch
- Developer: Federal Capital Commission

Other information
- Number of rooms: 145
- Number of restaurants: 1

Website
- https://hotelkurrajong.com.au

Hotel Kurrajong Canberra is a heritage-listed hotel located in the Canberra suburb of Barton, in the Australian Capital Territory, close to Parliament House and important national institutions within the Parliamentary Triangle. The hotel has a strong association with Australia's political history; notably, as the residence of Prime Minister Ben Chifley throughout his parliamentary career, including his term in office from 1945-1949. In 1951, Chifley suffered a fatal heart attack in room 205 at Hotel Kurrajong.

== History ==
Hotel Kurrajong was built between 1925 and 1927 as a hostel to provide accommodation for public servants in preparation for the relocation of the Parliament from Melbourne. The building was designed as an example of the Garden Pavilion style by Commonwealth chief architect John Smith Murdoch, in keeping with Walter Burley Griffin's garden city concept for the capital. The same concept of pavilions centred around garden courts was used for the earlier Hotel Canberra, built shortly before on the opposite side of the Parliamentary Triangle.

During the Great Depression, economic conditions and the reduction in the number of government employees reduced demand for accommodation in Canberra, and the Canberra and the Kurrajong were the only hotels left open for a time.

As was the case with the Hotel Canberra, the Kurrajong was frequently used as sitting-time accommodation by politicians. Kurrajong was reputedly favoured by politicians from the Australian Labor Party, and the Canberra by politicians from the conservative parties. Among others, prominent Australian Labor Party parliamentarian Ben Chifley resided at the hotel from 1940–1951 while in Canberra. When serving as Prime Minister of Australia, the modest Chifley chose to make the hotel his official residence rather than The Lodge. After declining an invitation to attend a Jubilee Ball to celebrate 50 years since Federation at the nearby Kings Hall, during the evening of 13 June 1951 he suffered a fatal heart attack while in his room at the hotel. Although he was taken to the Canberra Community Hospital, attempts to revive Chifley were unsuccessful.

By the late 1970s, guest numbers had declined and the hotel was closed and reused as offices for Parliamentary staff. The ACT Government signed a 50-year lease on the building in 1993, reopening it as a hotel in 1995. As part of the reopening, the ACT Government established the Australian International Hotel School, with the campus based at Hotel Kurrajong, offering accredited graduate qualifications specializing in hospitality and hotel management, operating alongside the hotel. The hotel was sold at auction to a joint venture between TFE Hotels and NRMA for a reported $7.65 million in 2013. The new owners announced intentions to extensively renovate Hotel Kurrajong, to be rebranded as "Hotel Kurrajong Canberra" with a 4.5-star fit-out, while not compromising heritage aspects of the building. The hotel was closed on 11 July 2014 to begin renovations and reopened on 11 February 2015.

== Heritage listings ==
Hotel Kurrajong was added to the Register of the National Estate in 1993 and the Australian Institute of Architects' Register of Significant Twentieth Century Architecture since 1984. As the second built of eight residential hostels planned during Canberra's early establishment, the hotel is also protected by the ACT Heritage Register and any alterations must be first approved by the National Capital Authority.
