= Commonwealth Government Offices, Brisbane =

Heritage-listed building in Brisbane, Queensland

Commonwealth Government Offices
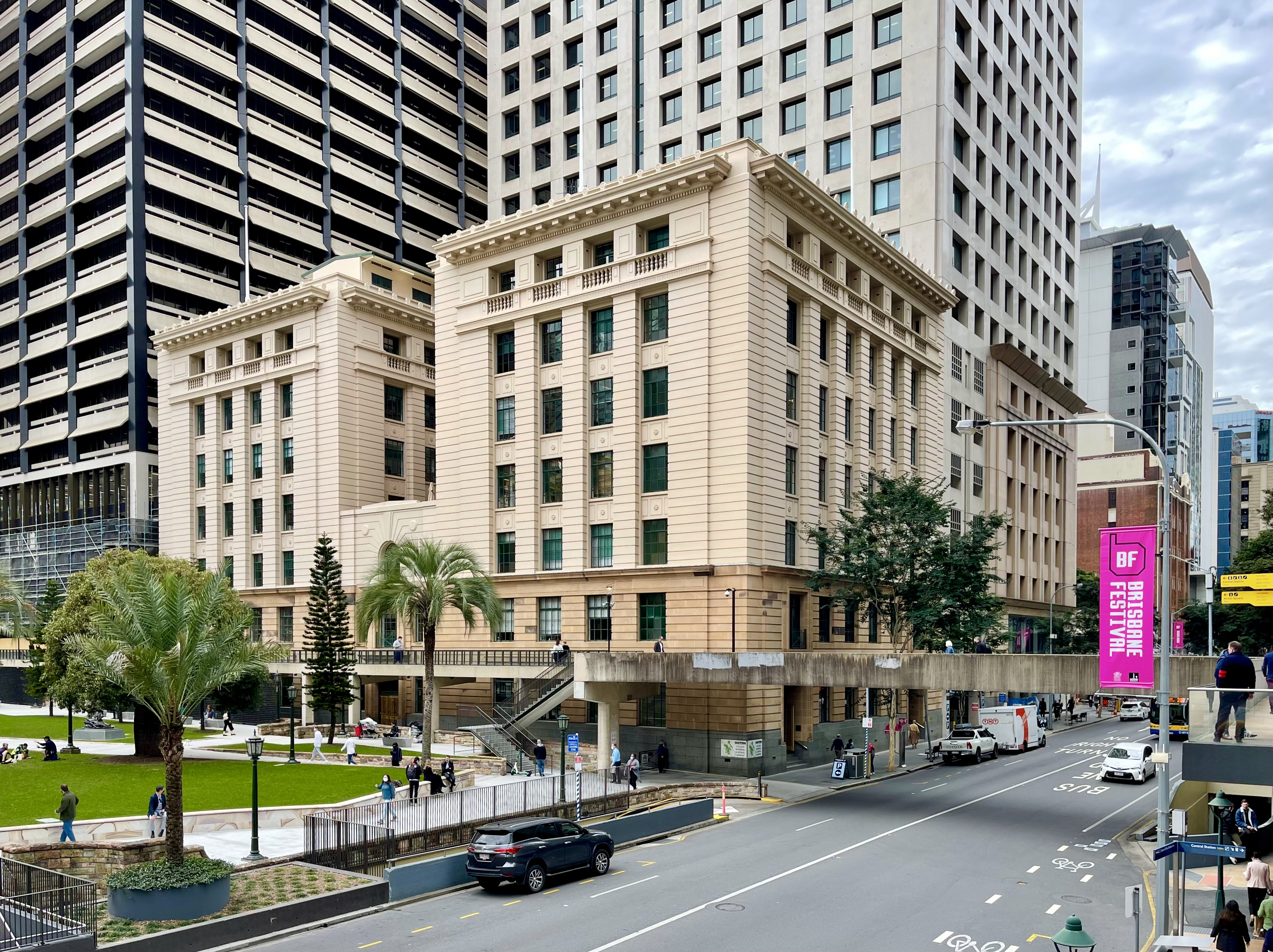
- Commonwealth Government Offices, 2021

- Location within Queensland Location within Australia
- 27.4664°S 153.0271°E
- Location: 232 Adelaide Street, Brisbane City, City of Brisbane, Queensland, Australia

History
- Design period: 1919–1930s (interwar period)
- Built: 1933–1936

Site notes
- Architect: John Smith Murdoch
- Architectural style: Classicism

Queensland Heritage Register
- Official name: Commonwealth Government Offices
- Type: state heritage (built)
- Designated: 21 October 1992
- Reference no.: 600064
- Significant period: 1930s (fabric)
- Significant components: office/s
- Builders: Relief work

Commonwealth Government Offices is a heritage-listed office building at 232 Adelaide Street, Brisbane City, City of Brisbane, Queensland, Australia. It was designed by John Smith Murdoch and built from 1933 to 1936 by relief workers. It was added to the Queensland Heritage Register on 21 October 1992.

== History ==
This building, the first offices owned by the Commonwealth Government in Brisbane, was erected from 1933 to 1936. It formed part of a 1920s to 1930s local, state and federal government re-development of the inner city Brisbane block bounded by Ann, Edward, Adelaide and Creek Streets, resulting in the construction of Anzac Square (1928–30) flanked by imposing State and Commonwealth Government Offices.

In the 1910s the Commonwealth Government had acquired the land between Ann and Adelaide Streets and fronting Creek Street, then occupied principally by commercial buildings, with the intention of erecting substantial Commonwealth offices on the site. There is some indication that this early scheme may have included the establishment of a public square opposite Central Railway Station.

A proposal was mooted in 1916 to develop a large memorial park and monument in the centre of Brisbane to commemorate Queensland sacrifice and participation in the Great War, and a committee was formed in 1919 to lobby for the creation of a commemorative square to occupy the whole of the land bounded by Ann, Edward, Adelaide and Creek Streets. Negotiations in the early 1920s between the Brisbane City Council (which wished to develop the park), the Queensland Government (which owned the southern part of the block) and Commonwealth Government (which owned the northern section) resulted in a smaller area determined for the park, which was to be flanked by similarly designed Commonwealth Government Offices to the north and State Government Offices to the south. In 1923 John Smith Murdoch, the Chief Architect of the Commonwealth Department of Home Affairs, prepared an overall design for the precinct, as well as designs for Commonwealth Government Offices on the north side of the proposed square.

In the mid-1920s both the State and Commonwealth governments dedicated part of the block to become a public park under the control of the Brisbane City Council, and Anzac Memorial Park was developed on the site in 1928 to 1930.

In 1927 the Commonwealth Public Works Committee agreed to erect a seven-storey building to cover the whole of the remaining Commonwealth property between Adelaide and Ann Streets and fronting Creek Street. The existing buildings on the site were demolished in 1928, but the downturn in the economy delayed construction. In 1933 the State Government requested that building begin, to provide work for the unemployed. Financial stringency called for the modification of the plans, and only two wings of the original design were built for a cost of £90,000. This work was completed in 1936, and provided 35,000 square feet (3,300 m^{2}) of office space. With its restrained use of co-ordinated Classical detailing, the building complemented the adjacent Anzac Square and the State Government Offices. The State Government Offices are now known as the Anzac Square Building and were designed by the Queensland Government Architect's Office in keeping with Murdoch's overall scheme, and erected in stages between 1931 and 1960.

In 1968 the government abandoned the prescribed design for completion of the Commonwealth Government Offices and in 1972 instead erected a new 15 storey office block on the corner of Ann and Creek Streets. In the 1980s the exterior of the building was refurbished.

== Description ==
The Commonwealth Government building, situated in Adelaide Street adjacent to Anzac Square, is a seven storeyed masonry building. It has a concrete encased steel frame with a polished granite base, sandstone cladding with banded rusticated coursing to second floor level, and upper levels of rendered brick imitating the stonework below.

The top storey is visually separated by balconies across its openings and a large projecting cornice incorporating dentil blocks. Antifixae are regularly spaced along the upper surface of the cornice. The recess between the wings facing Anzac Square extends down to the third floor level which has an arched opening and a flat roof. The lift tower situated at the back of the recess extends above the parapet line of the remainder of the building. It culminates in an archway with a keystone, and then steps inwards to a flat top.

The entry facade to Adelaide Street has its end window bays visually separated. Entries occur at the base of these bays, the major public entry on the right. Plain giant order pilasters occur to either side of the fourth and fifth floor windows of these bays. Cable moulding is a decorative feature of the facade around each entry. The windows are all steel framed casements. Granite steps lead to the recessed entry doors which are bronze sheeted with adjoining bronze and copper panelling. The entry screens are wrought iron.

The ground floor lobby is lined with imported marble while the floor is formed of black and white mosaic tiles. The upper level lobbies use terrazzo instead. Some of the moulded plaster ornamentation is visible at the tops of the columns, on the faces of the pilasters, and under the beams on the ground floor. The upper floors have drop panels on two sides of the columns and on the face of the pilasters. A timber Commonwealth crest has been installed between the doors of two of the refurbished lifts in the lobby.

== Heritage listing ==
Commonwealth Government Offices was listed on the Queensland Heritage Register on 21 October 1992 having satisfied the following criteria.

The place is important in demonstrating the evolution or pattern of Queensland's history.

Commonwealth Government Offices is important in illustrating the expansion and centralisation of Commonwealth bureaucracy in Queensland in the early 20th century. As an integral part of the Anzac Square precinct re-development of the 1920s and 1930s, the place is important evidence of early co-operation and co-ordination between local, state and federal governments. Construction of the Commonwealth Government Offices is significant also as an important government job-creation scheme in Queensland during the 1930s depression.

The place is important in demonstrating the principal characteristics of a particular class of cultural places.

Commonwealth Government Offices is an accomplished example of a 1930s Neo-classical government office building in Brisbane, and is important in illustrating the principal characteristics of its type.

The place is important because of its aesthetic significance.

Aesthetically, it is significant for its coherence in design, scale and materials with Anzac Square and the adjacent State Government Offices.

The place has a special association with the life or work of a particular person, group or organisation of importance in Queensland's history.

Commonwealth Government Offices is also significant as an example of the government work of distinguished architect JS Murdoch.
