= John Smith Murdoch =

Scottish-Australian architect (1862–1945)

John Smith Murdoch CMG
- Born: 29 September 1862; Cassieford Farm, Forres, Scotland
- Died: 21 May 1945 (aged 82); Brighton, Victoria, Australia
- Occupation: Architect
- Known for: Old Parliament House, Canberra

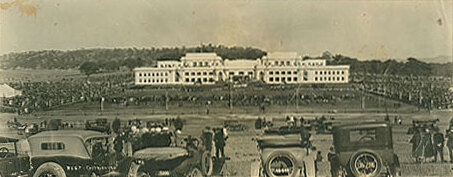
Opening of Old Parliament House, Canberra, 1927

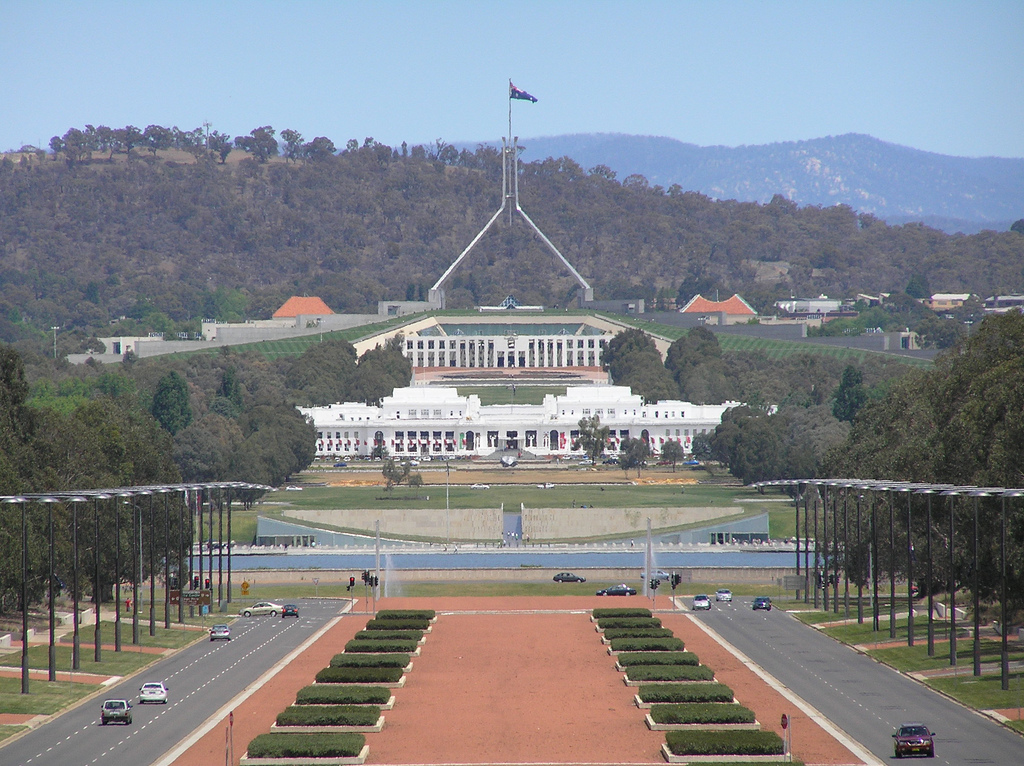
Old and New Parliament House, Canberra, 2006

John Smith Murdoch CMG (29 September 1862 – 21 May 1945) was a Scottish architect who practised in Australia from the 1880s until 1930. Employed by the newly formed Commonwealth Public Works Department in 1904, he rose to become chief architect, from 1919 to 1929, and was responsible for designing many government buildings, most notably the Provisional Parliament House in Canberra, the home of the Parliament of Australia from 1927 to 1988.

== Personal life ==
John Smith Murdoch was born in Cassieford Farm, Forres, Scotland.

He had a "dry and quiet" personality and was frugal in both his professional and private life. Murdoch never married, and there are only two official known photographs of him.

Murdoch was a member of the Masonic order and it is claimed that he incorporated many masonic motifs into his designs.

He died in Brighton, Melbourne.

== Professional life ==
Murdoch was educated at the Parish school at Rafford and at Forres Academy and received his architectural training in Scotland. He was articled to the architectural firm Matthews and Mackenzie in 1878. After completing his articles in 1883 he became assistant in the office of Alexander Ross in Inverness before moving to Glasgow to work for Campbell Douglas & Sellars and then for the Glasgow South Western Railway Engineers' Department. In 1884 Murdoch emigrated with his parents to Melbourne in response to the severe depression of the 1880s.

In Melbourne, Murdoch was briefly employed by the architectural firm Reed, Henderson and Smart before being appointed as a draftsman in the Queensland Department of Public Works in 1885. While working for the Public Works Department, Murdoch is said to have designed the Sandgate Post Office (1887) before being retrenched on 30 June 1887 due to a downturn in public works.

Murdoch then joined the firm John Hall and Son where he was employed until 1893. While working for John Hall and Son, it is claimed that Murdoch designed the South Brisbane Municipal Chambers (1890–1892), Gladstone Place and several South Brisbane hotels, including Broadway Hotel (1889–90) and Burke's Hotel (1890).

In 1893, Murdoch was re-appointed to the Public Works Department where he worked until 1904. During this time he worked on a great number of public buildings throughout Queensland. The design work produced by the department at this time was somewhat collaborative. Other prominent architects working for the Queensland Public Works Department who may have contributed to design work credited to Murdoch (and vice versa) include Thomas Pye and Alfred Barton Brady.

In 1904 Murdoch transferred to the Commonwealth Department of Home Affairs in Melbourne, as a Senior Clerk. Here he was promoted to Architect in 1914 and Chief Architect in 1919–29. He was involved with the planning of Canberra and designed many significant Commonwealth buildings around Australia including the Provisional Parliament House, Canberra (1927), the Canberra Hotel (1922–25), the General Post Office, Perth (1923), Spencer Street Mail Exchange (1913) and the Former High Court of Australia (1925), both in Melbourne. He laid out Forrest Place, Perth (1923), and Anzac Square, Brisbane (1926). Murdoch was promoted to Director-General of Works by 1927 and was appointed C.M.G. (Companion of the Order of St. Michael and St. George) to honour his service to the Commonwealth of Australia. Murdoch moved to Canberra with his department in 1929 and retired later the same year, remaining a member of the Federal Capital Commission until its abolition in 1930.

== Works ==
=== Queensland ===
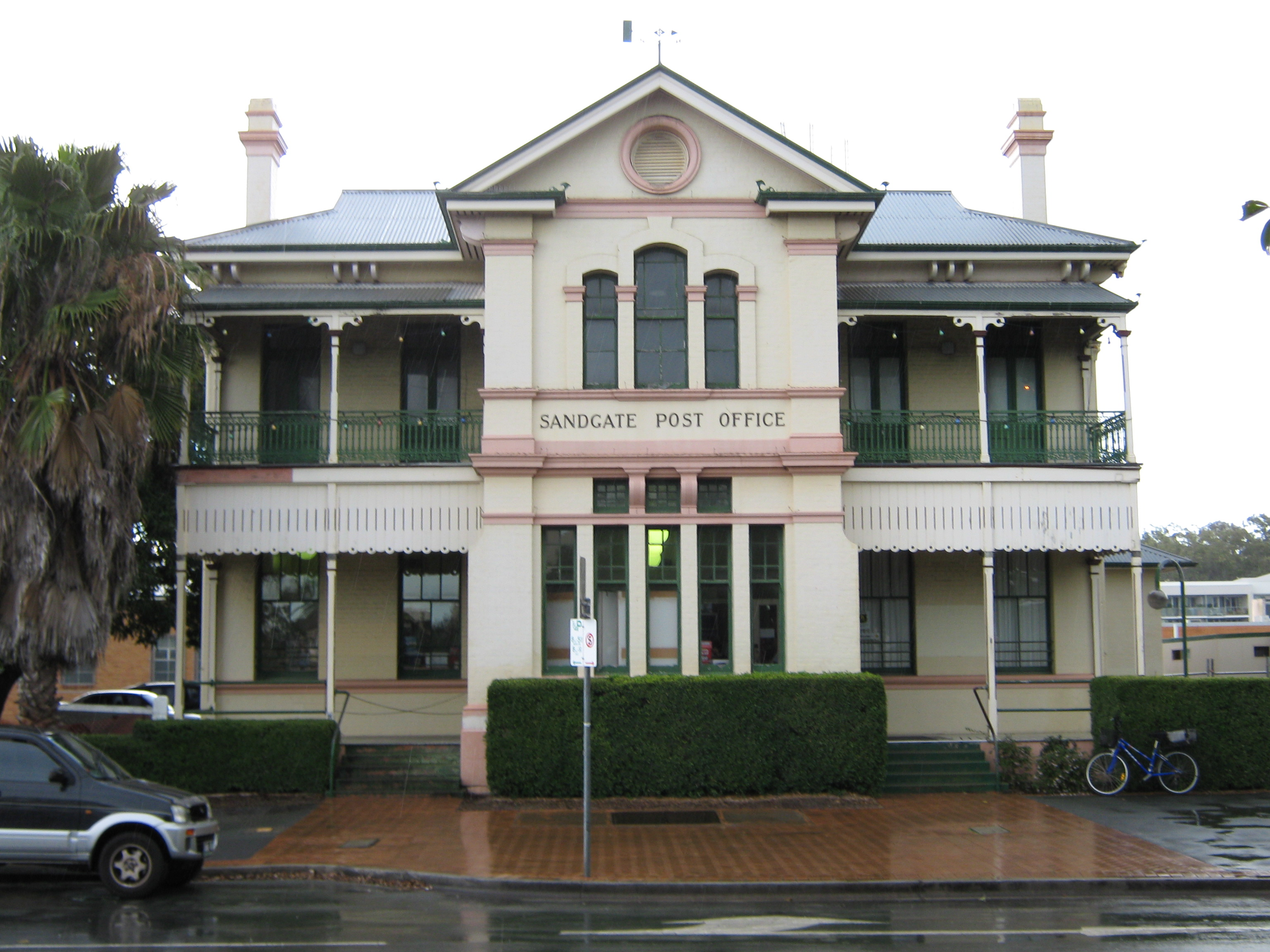
Sandgate Post Office, 1887

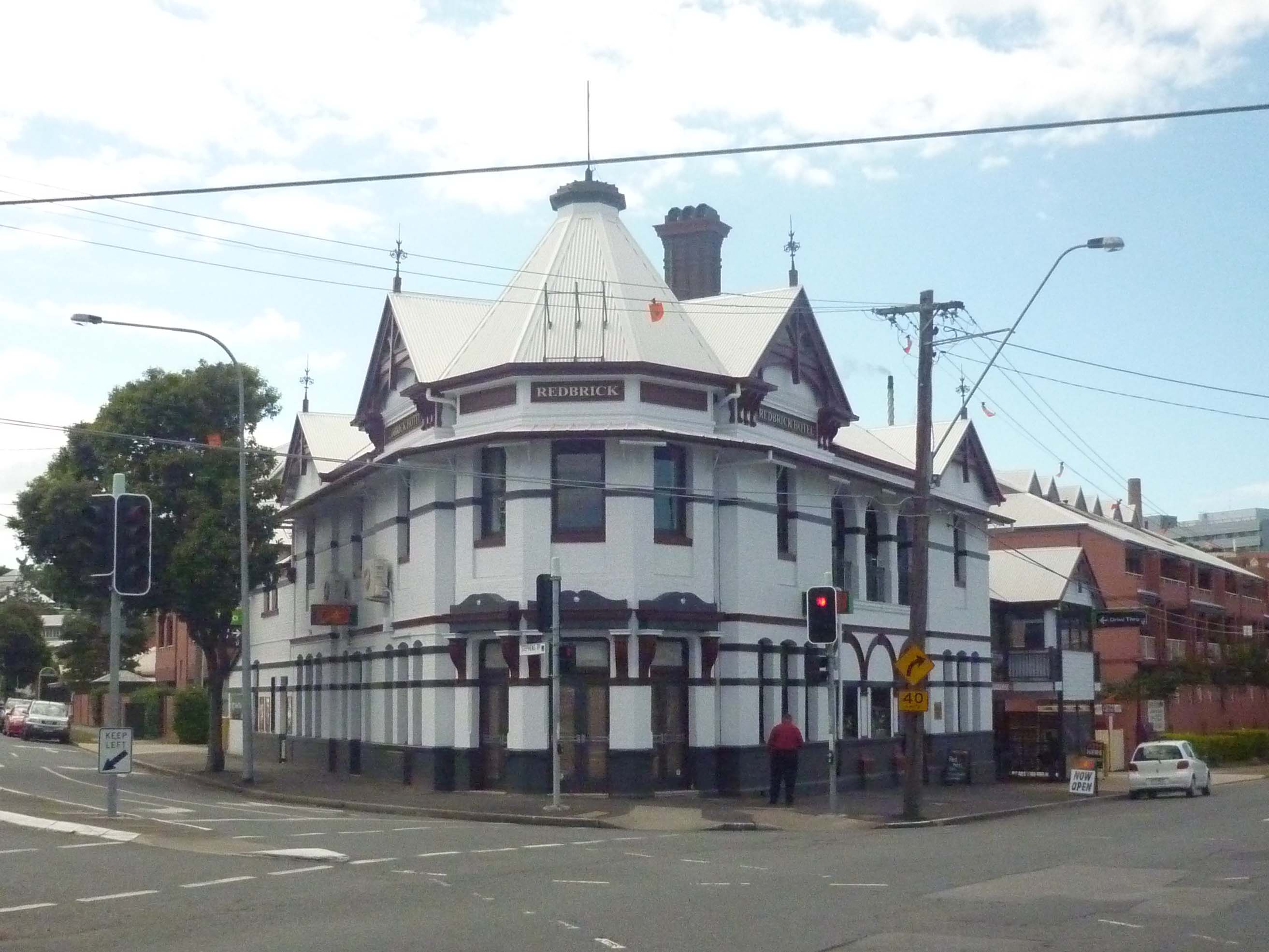
Burke's Hotel, South Brisbane, 1889–90

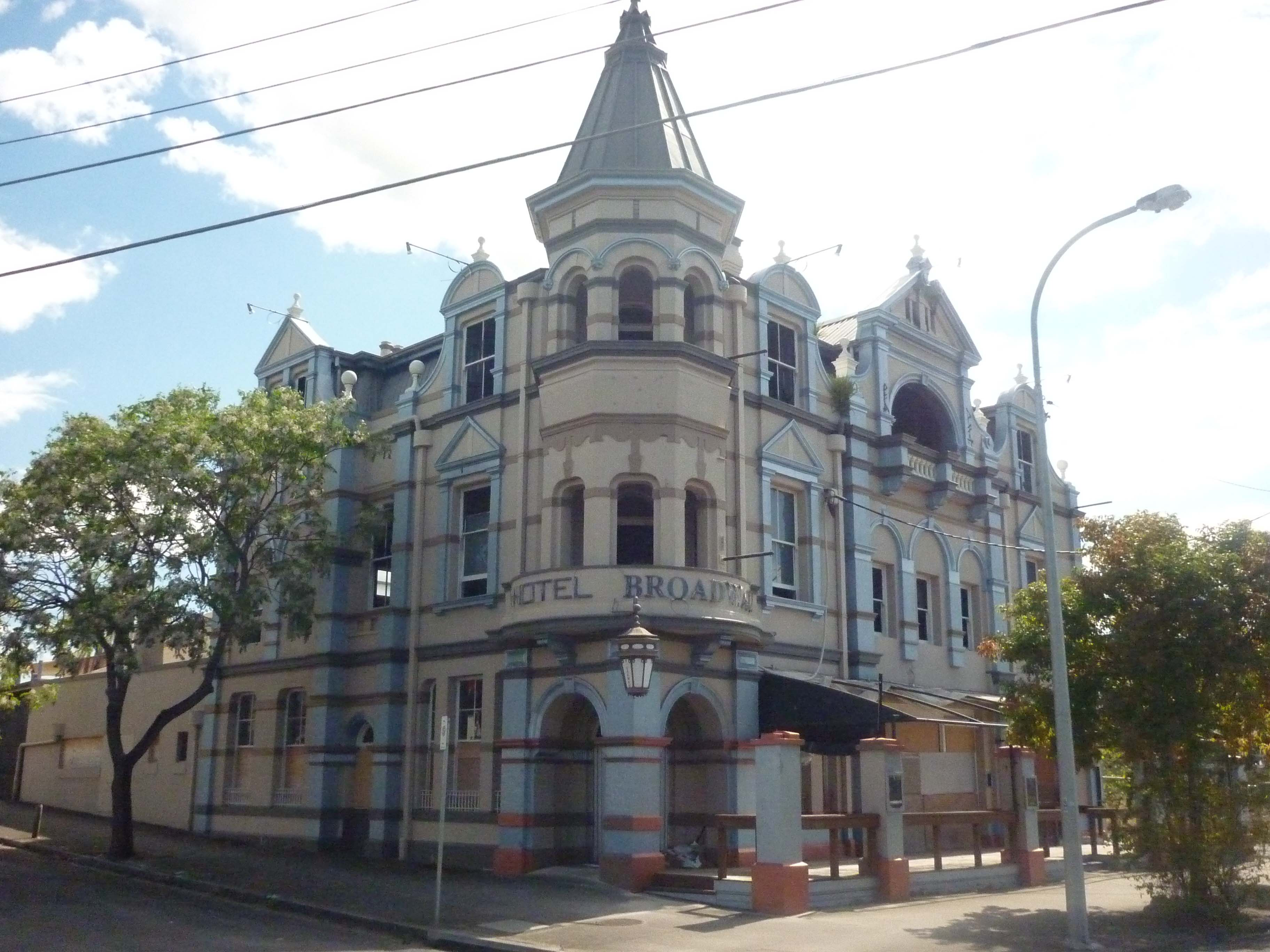
Broadway Hotel, Woolloongabba, 1890

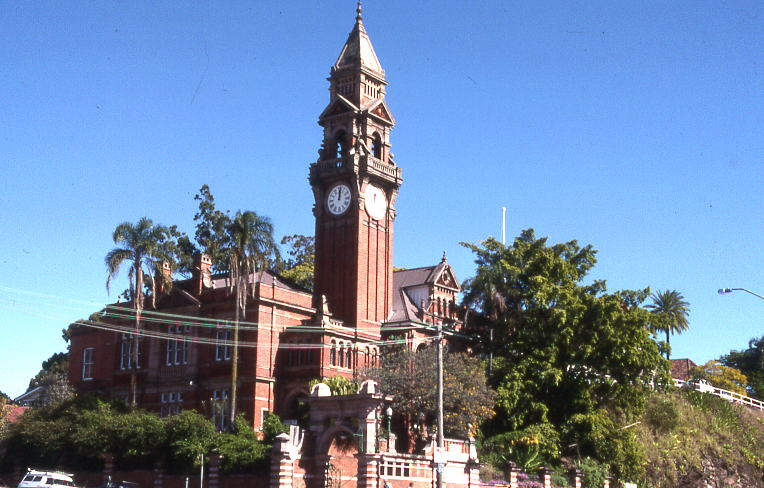
South Brisbane Municipal Chambers, 1890

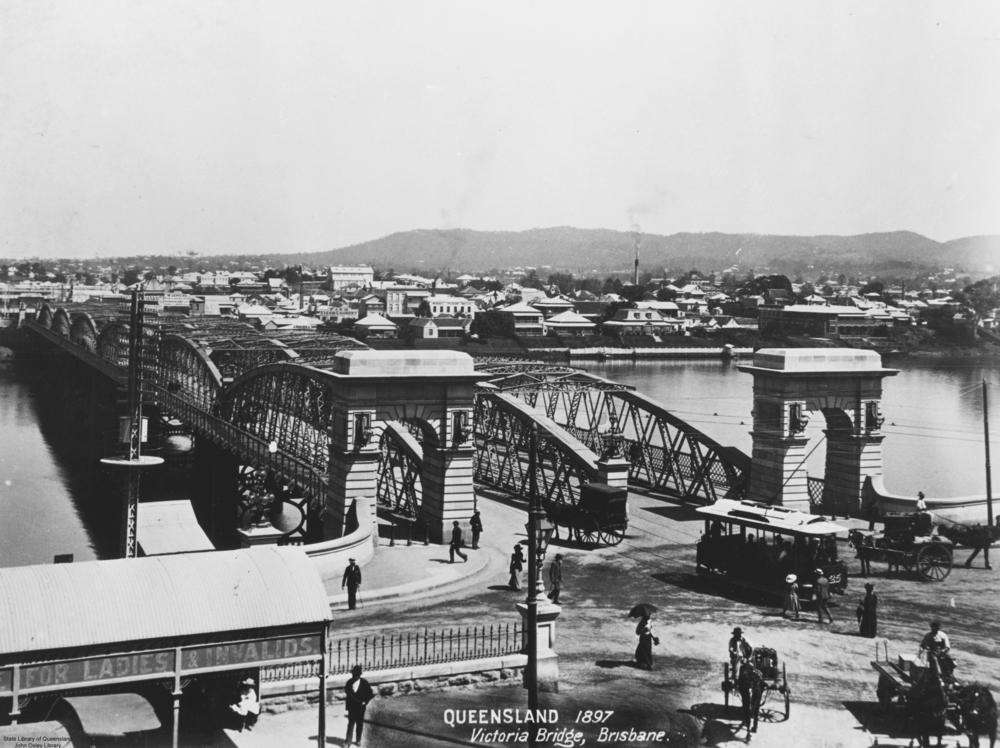
Victoria Bridge, Brisbane, 1897

List of known works in Queensland:

1887	Sandgate Post Office (former): 1 Bowser Parade, Sandgate 4017
1888–89	West End School of Arts (demolished): Boundary Street, West End 4101
1889–90	Burke's Hotel (Red Brick Hotel): 83 Annerley Road, South Brisbane 4102
1890	Broadway Hotel: 93 Logan Road, Woolloongabba 4102
1890	South Brisbane Municipal Chambers (South Brisbane Town Hall): 263 Vulture Street, West End 4101
1894–95	Victoria Bridge Abutments (bridge demolished, abutments existent): Victoria Bridge, South Brisbane 4101 (with A.B. Brady)
1896	Queensland Agricultural College (University of Queensland Gatton campus) (partially demolished, Foundation Building and Homestead existent): Warrego Highway, Lawes 4343
1897	Central Watch-tower, Stewart's Creek Gaol (Stuart Creek Jail), Dwyer Street, Stuart, Townsville, 4811
1897	Charleville Court House (demolished): Alfred Street, Charleville 4470
1897	Dalby Consumptive's Hospital (Jubilee Sanatorium, Jubilee Hospital) (demolished), Dalby
1898–1900	Maryborough Customs House: Richmond Street, Maryborough 4650
1900–01	Roma Court House: 141 McDowall Street, Roma 4455
1900–01	Mackay Customs House: 31 River Street, Mackay 4740
1900–01	Gympie Court House, Channon Street, Gympie 4570
1900–01	Stanthorpe Post Office: 14 Maryland Street, Stanthorpe 4380
1900–01	Brisbane Naval Offices: 3 Edward Street, Brisbane 4000 (with Thomas Pye?)
1900–02	Bundaberg Customs House (demolished): Quay Street, Bundaberg 4670
1903	Boggo Road Gaol: No. 2 Division: 150 Annerley Road, Dutton Park 4102
1903–04	St. Luke's Mission Hall (The Pancake Manor): 10 Charlotte Street, Brisbane 4000
1903–04	St. John's School and Institute (Webber House): 439 Ann Street, Brisbane 4000 (with Robin Dods)
1926	Anzac Square, Brisbane: 228 Adelaide Street, Brisbane 4000
1932–59	Former Queensland Government Offices: 255A Ann Street, Brisbane 4000
1933–36	Commonwealth Government Offices: 232 Adelaide Street, Brisbane 4000

=== Victoria ===
Notable works include:

- former Royal Australian Field Artillery (RAFA) Barracks, part of the Commonwealth Ordnance Factory, Maribyrnong (1911–13)
- HMAS Cerberus Naval Base, Crib Point, Westernport Bay (1913–20)
- RAAF Williams, Point Cook (1913–18)
- former Naval Drill Hall, 40 Bay Street, Port Melbourne (1912)
- Commonwealth Offices, 4 Treasury Place, East Melbourne (1912)
- former Mail Exchange, cnr Spencer Street and Bourke Street, Melbourne(1913)
- former Federal Woollen Mills, North Geelong (1915).
- former High Court, Little Bourke Street (1926).
- former Australian Wireless Transmitting and Receiving Stations, Fiskville (1926)
- Telephone Exchange, 436 Little Bourke Street (designed 1929, built 1935)

=== Western Australia ===
Notable Western Australian works include:

- General Post Office, Perth (1914–23), created along with Forrest Place, which it addresses, was designed in association with William Hardwick who at the time was the Western Australia Government Architect.
- the Commonwealth Bank, which is adjacent to the Post Office and repeats its architectural elements, is thought to have been designed by Murdoch in 1929, the year he retired, though the plans carry the signature of Thomas Hill, the Director General of Works. It was completed in 1933.

=== Canberra ===
Murdoch persuaded Walter Burley Griffin to come to Australia from the US, and went to Sydney to greet him on his arrival in 1913. Later, however, he had a difficult relationship with Griffin.

Murdoch designed the Provisional Parliament House in Canberra, which opened in 1927. However, he had no enthusiasm for the project, saying expenditure on it could not be justified at the time; and he thought the whole idea was a waste of money.

Murdoch also designed many of Canberra's first public buildings, such as:

- Kingston Power Station (1913–1915). This was decommissioned in the early 1960s, and reopened on 25 May 2007 as Canberra Glassworks, a glass artist studio.
- the Hotel Canberra (Hostel No. 1) (1924) – now the Hyatt Hotel
- the Hotel Kurrajong (Hostel No. 2) (1926)
- Secretariat Buildings No. 1 and 2 (1927) – now East and West Blocks
- Gorman House (Hostel No. 3) (1924–25)
- Ainslie Public School (1936)
- several residential hotels necessary for public servants and politicians.

=== New South Wales ===
- 12 bungalows for staff of the Royal Australian Navy College (1915), HMAS Creswell, Jervis Bay, New South Wales. The bungalows are now heritage-listed, and were refurbished in 2006–07.

== Gallery of work ==
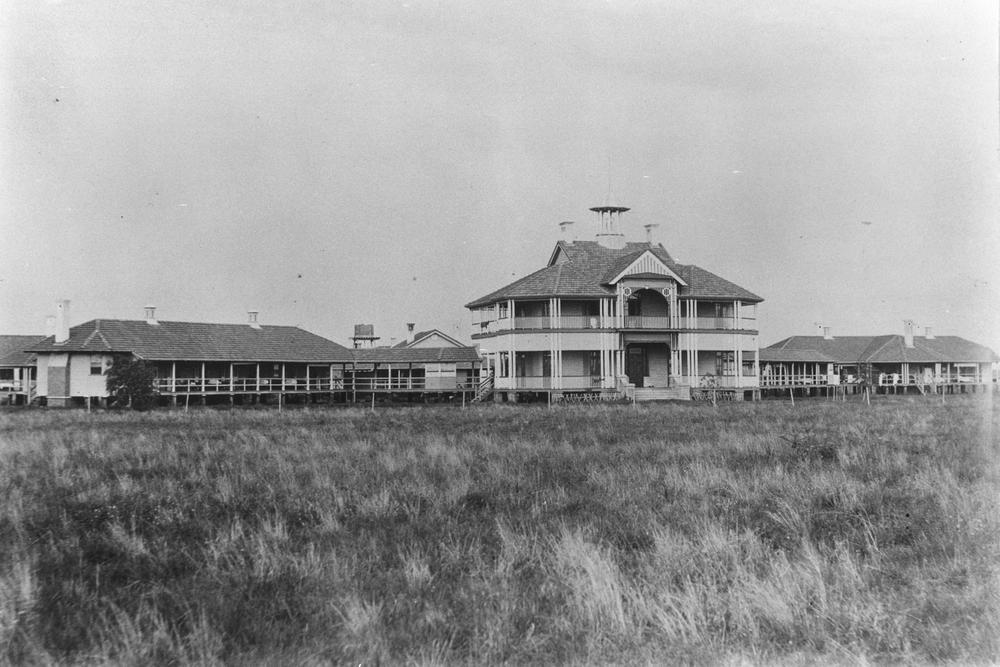
Dalby Consumptive's Hospital, Dalby, 1897

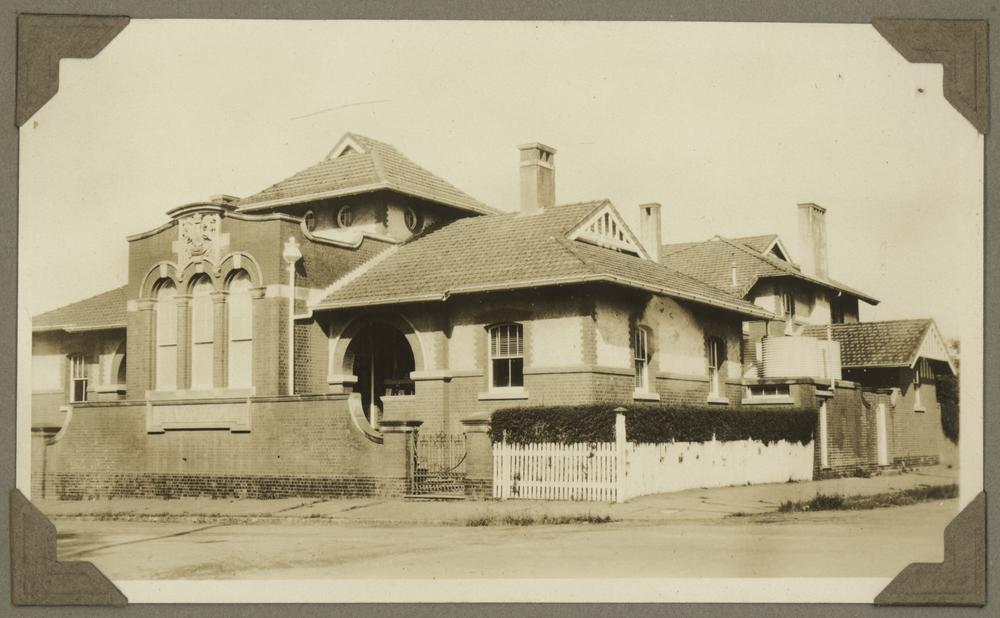
Maryborough Customs House, Maryborough, 1900

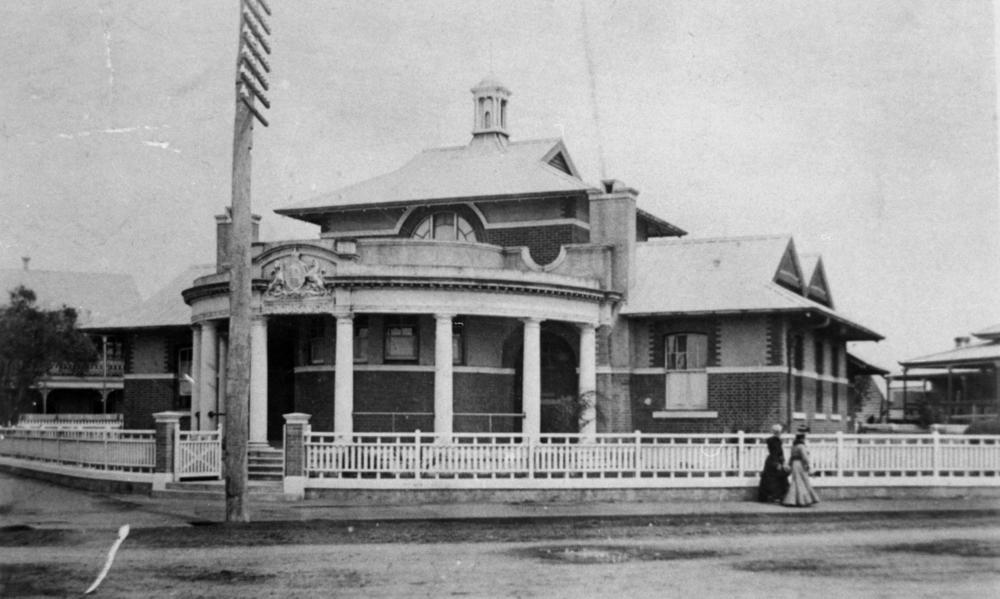
Mackay Customs House, Mackay, 1900–01

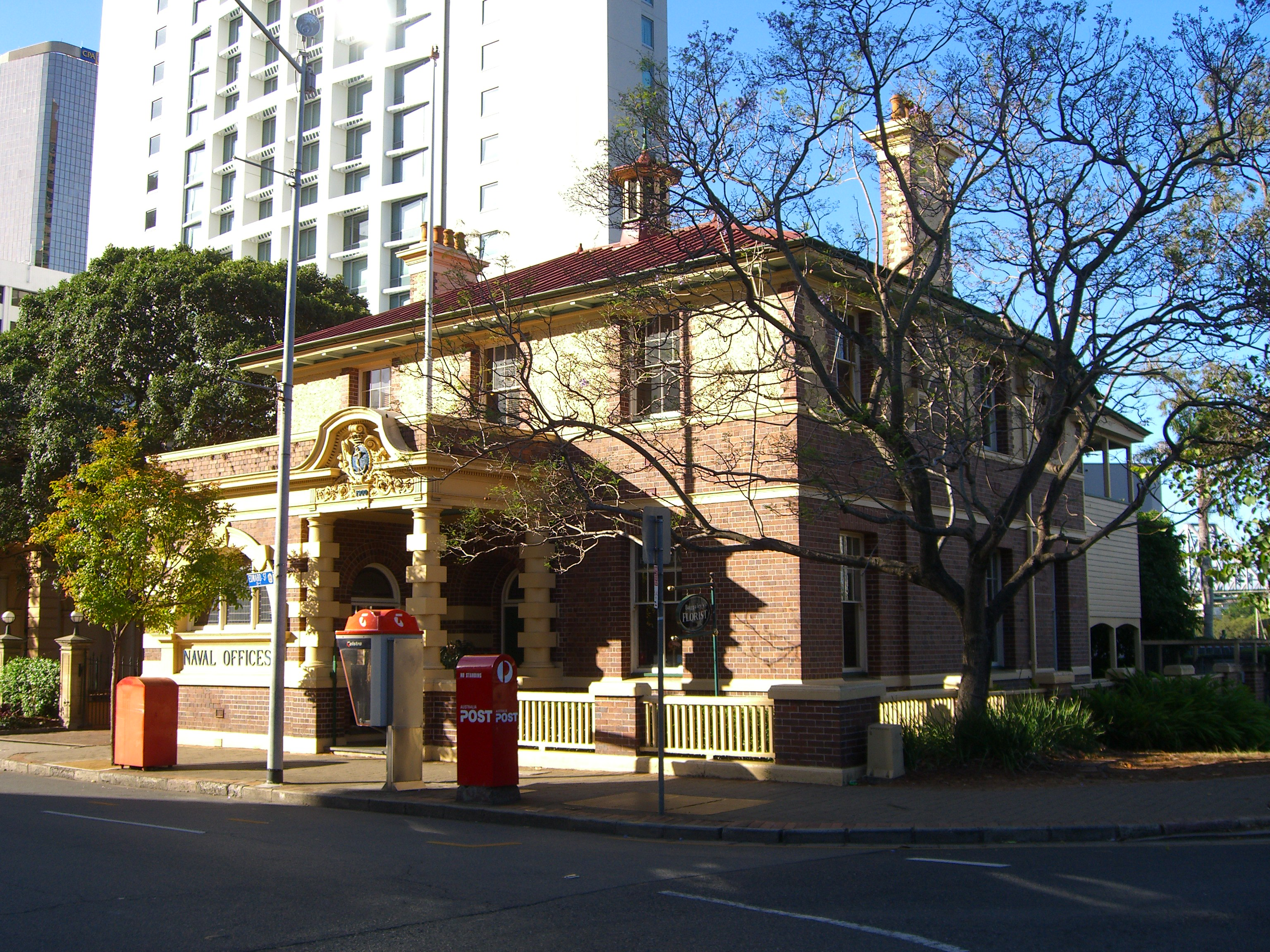
Brisbane Naval Offices, 1901

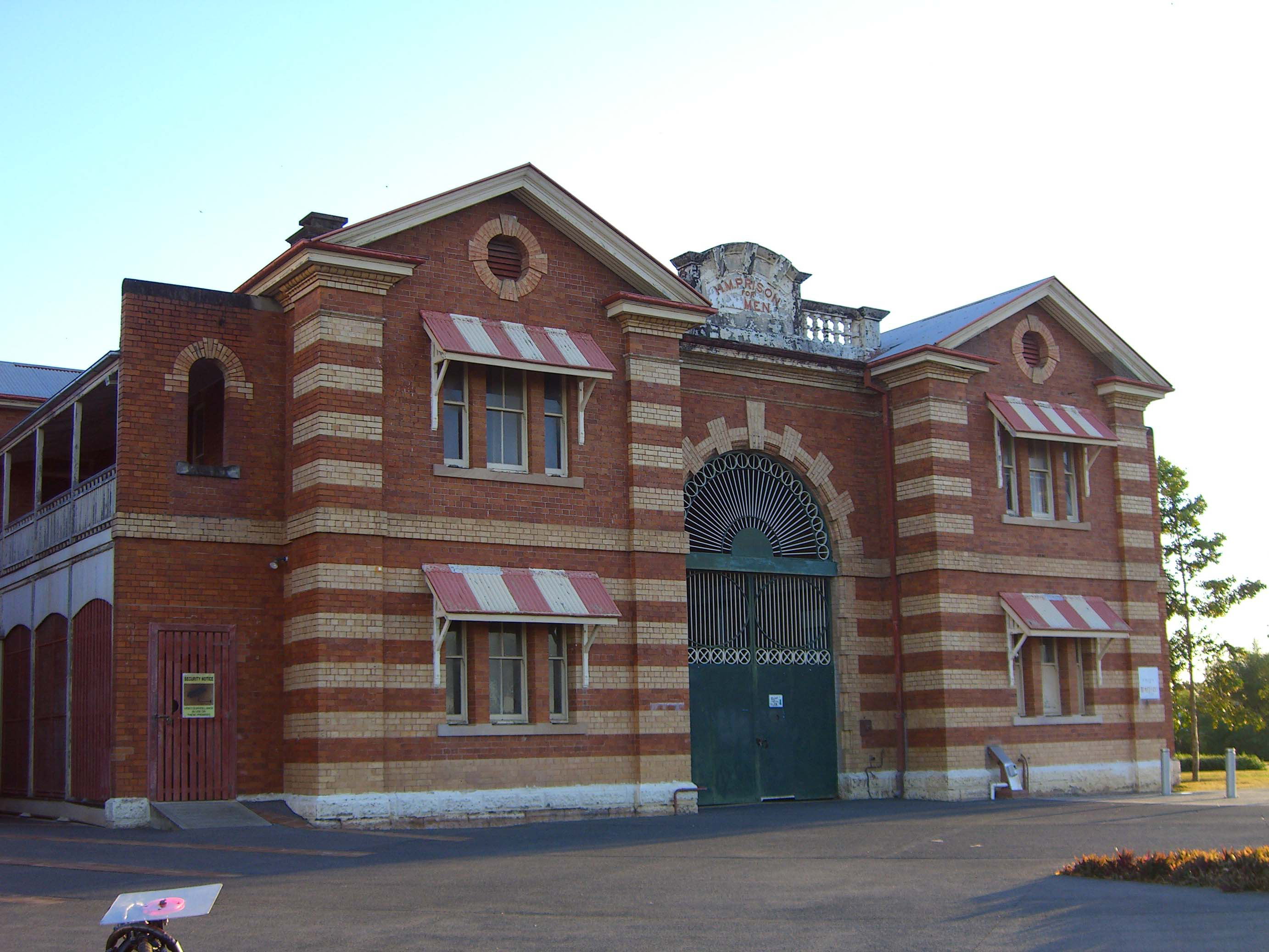
Boggo Road Gaol, No. 2 Division, Dutton Park, Brisbane, 1903

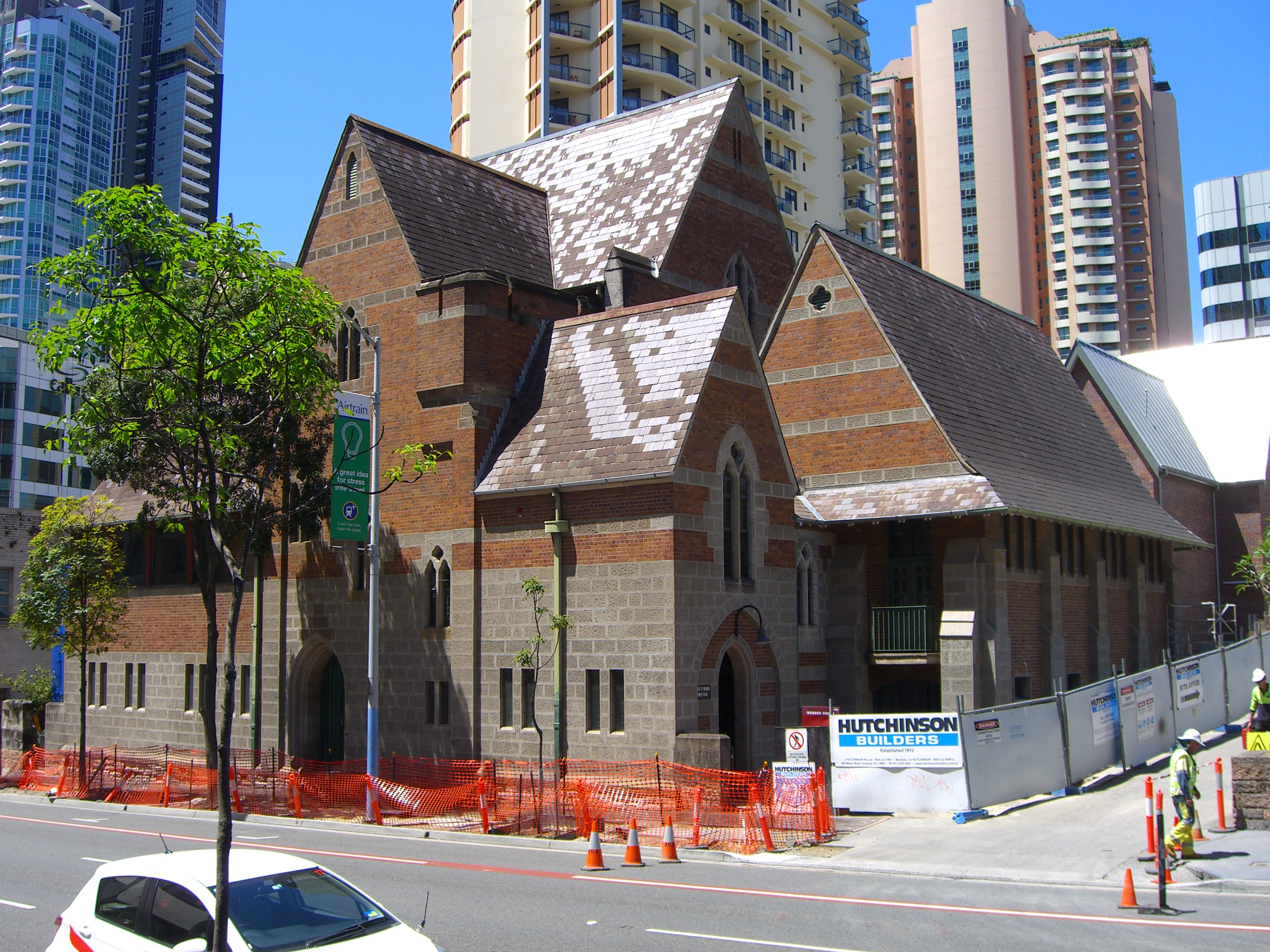
St. Johns' School and Institute, Brisbane, 1903–04

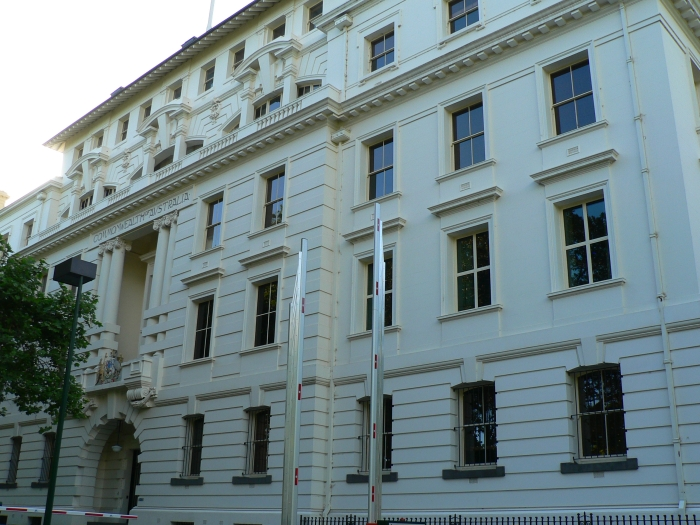
Commonwealth Government Offices, Treasury Place, Melbourne, 1912

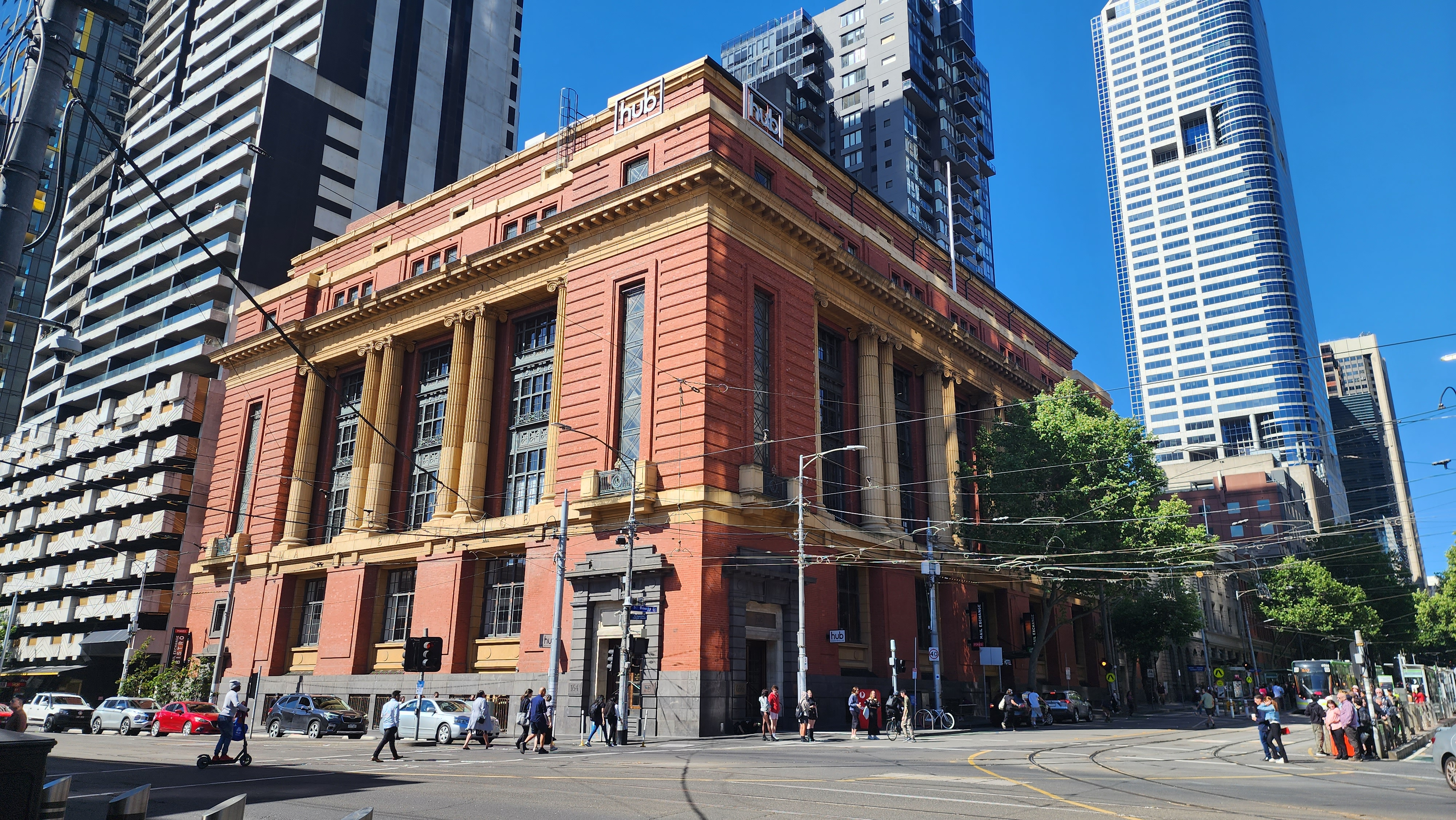
Former mail exchange, Melbourne, 1913–17

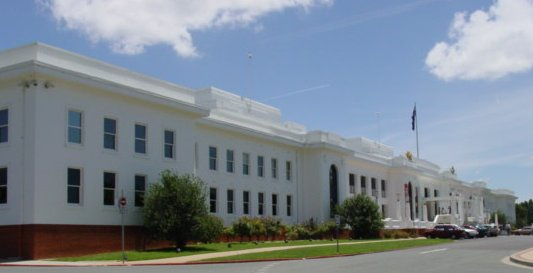
Provisional Parliament House, Canberra, 1922

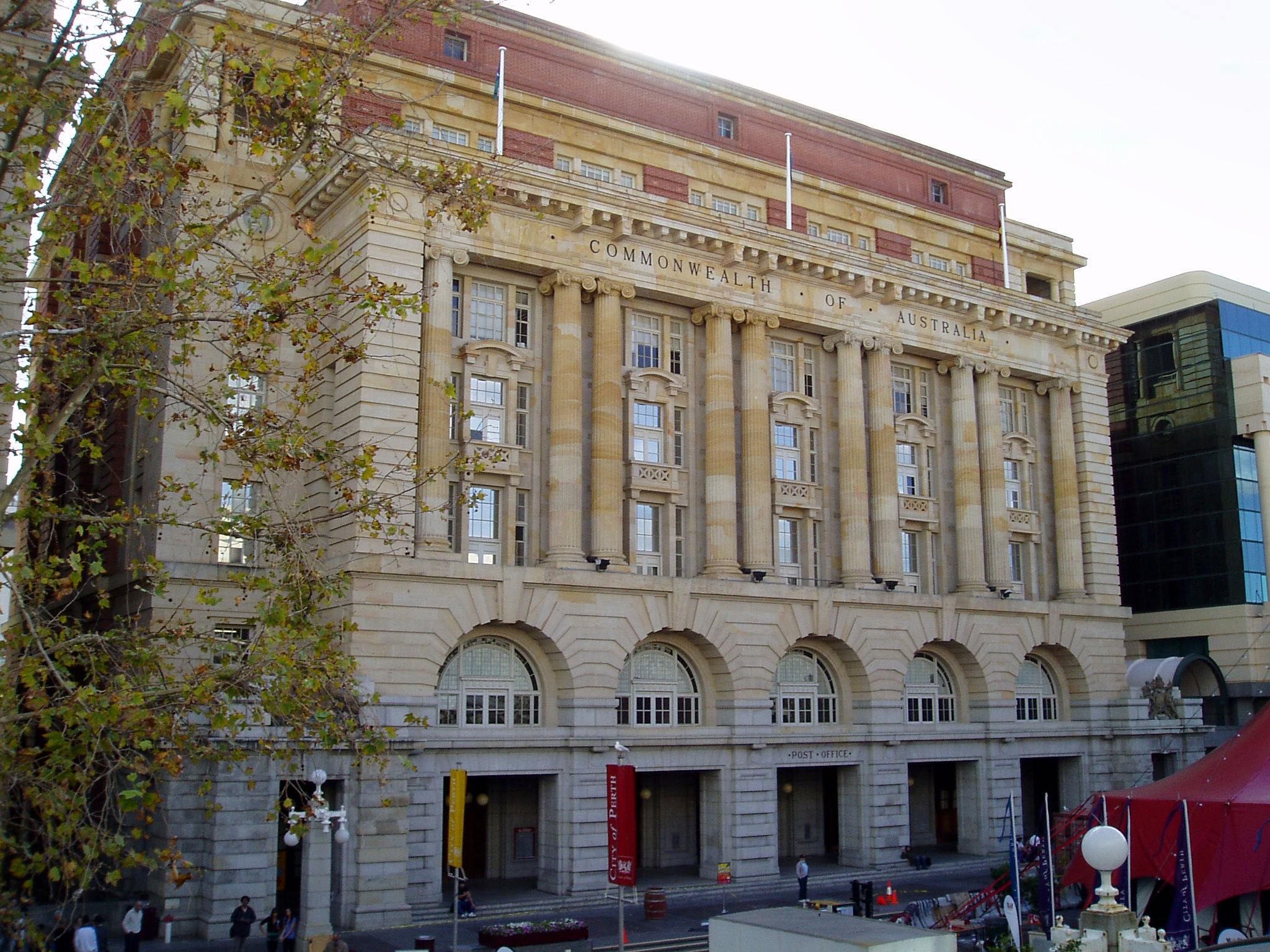
GPO, Forrest Place, Perth, 1923

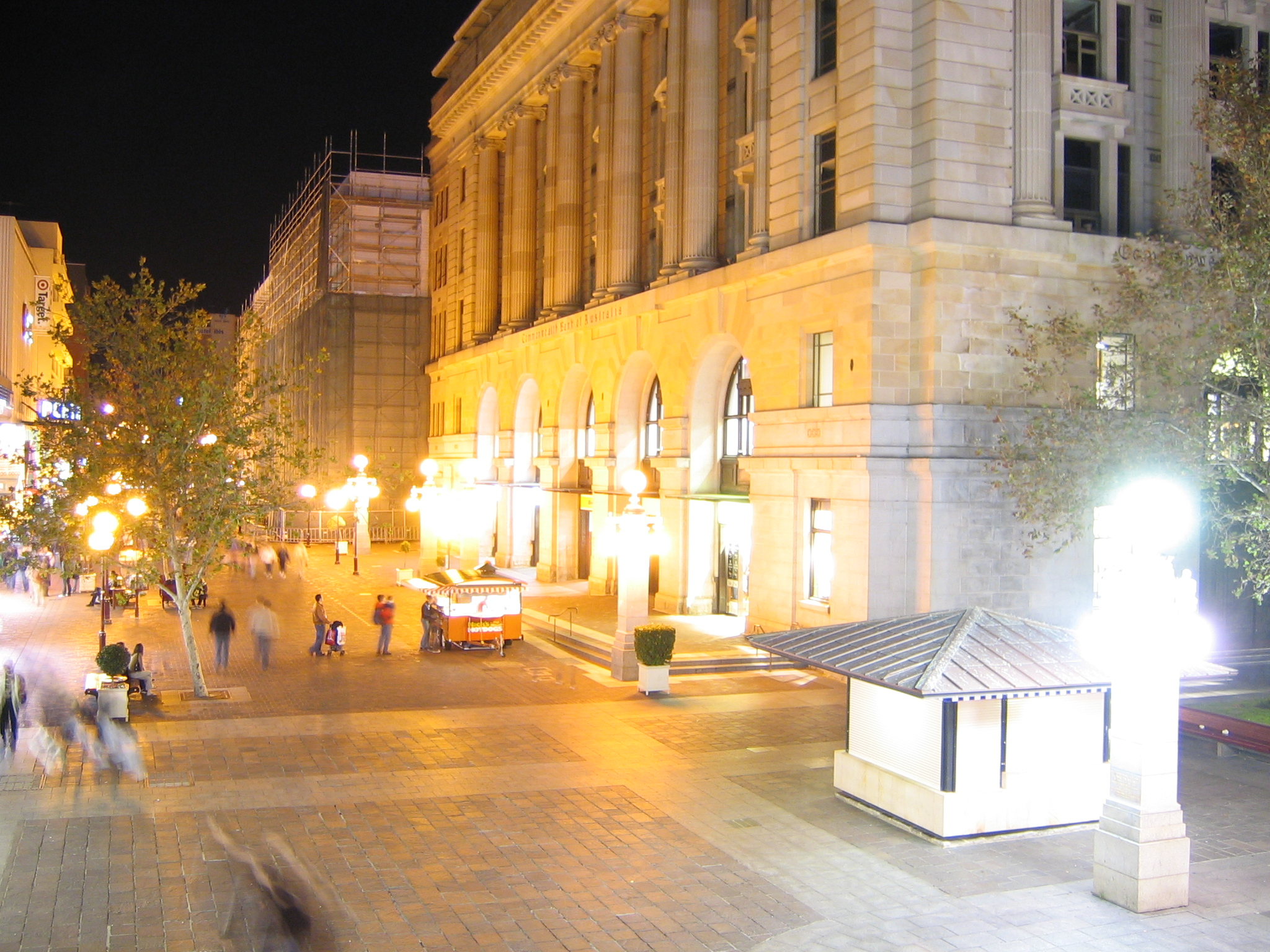
Commonwealth Bank Building, Forrest Place, Perth, 1923

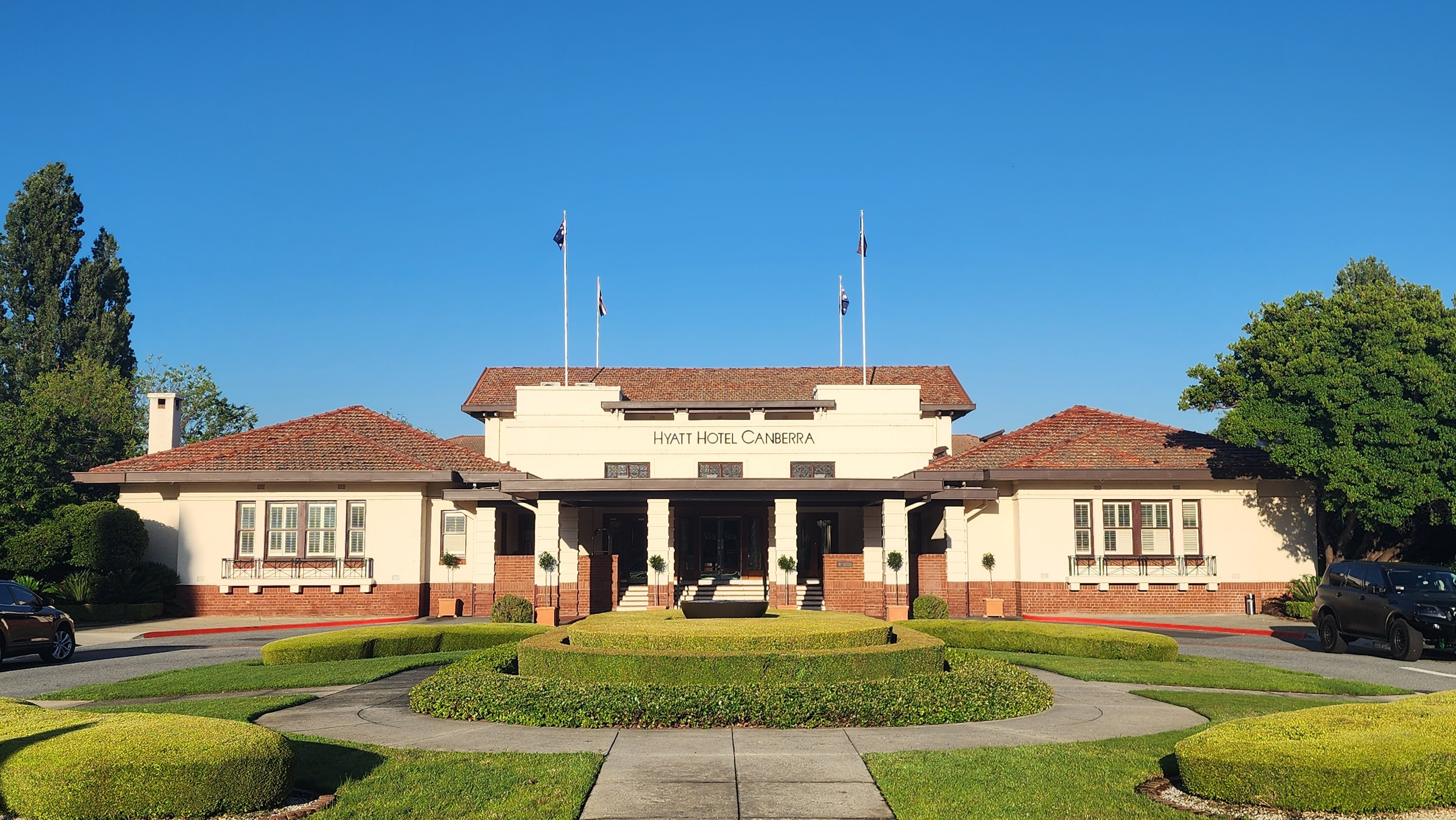
Hotel Canberra, 1924

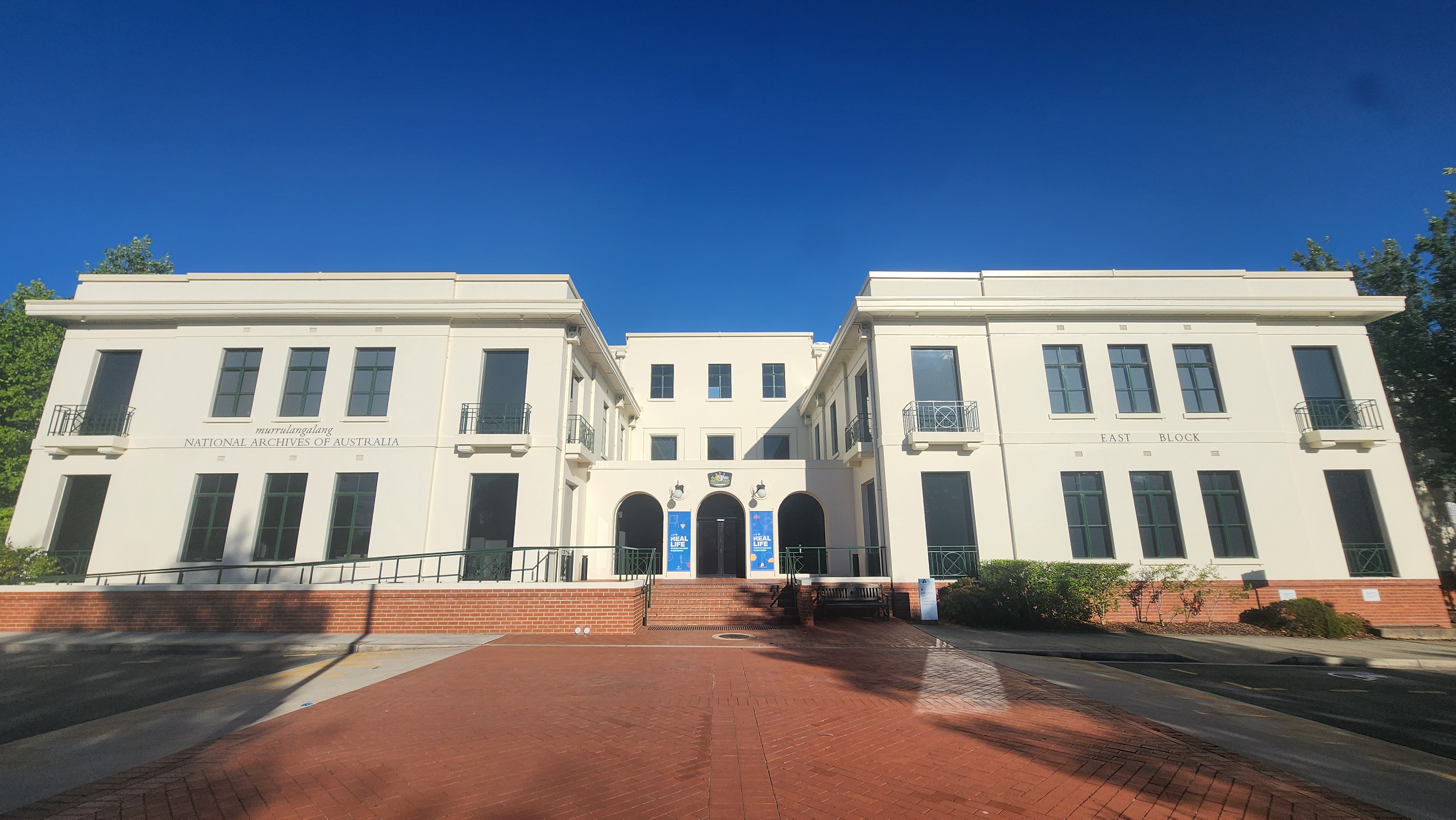
National Archives of Australia, Canberra, 1925–56

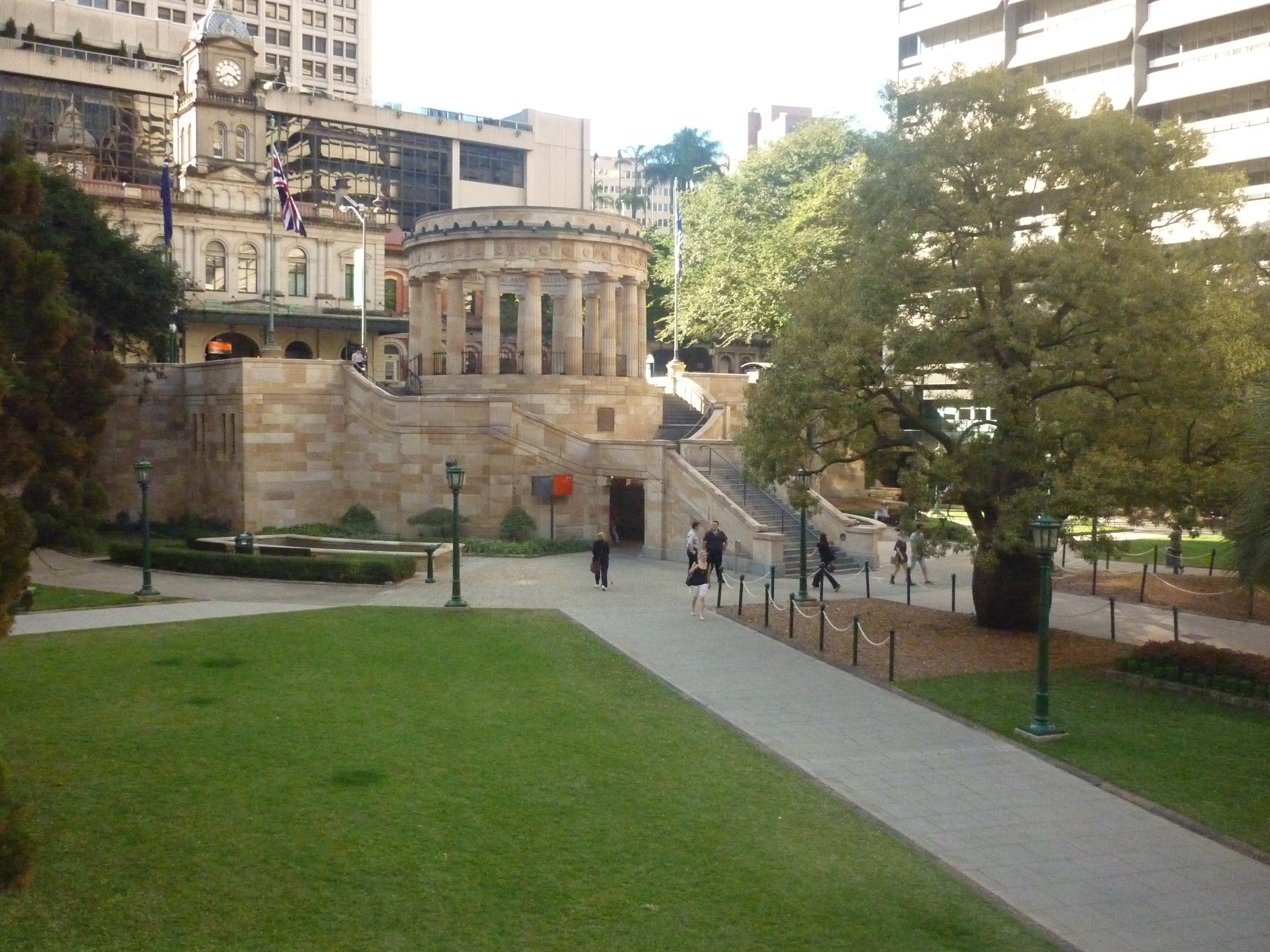
Anzac Square, Brisbane, 1926

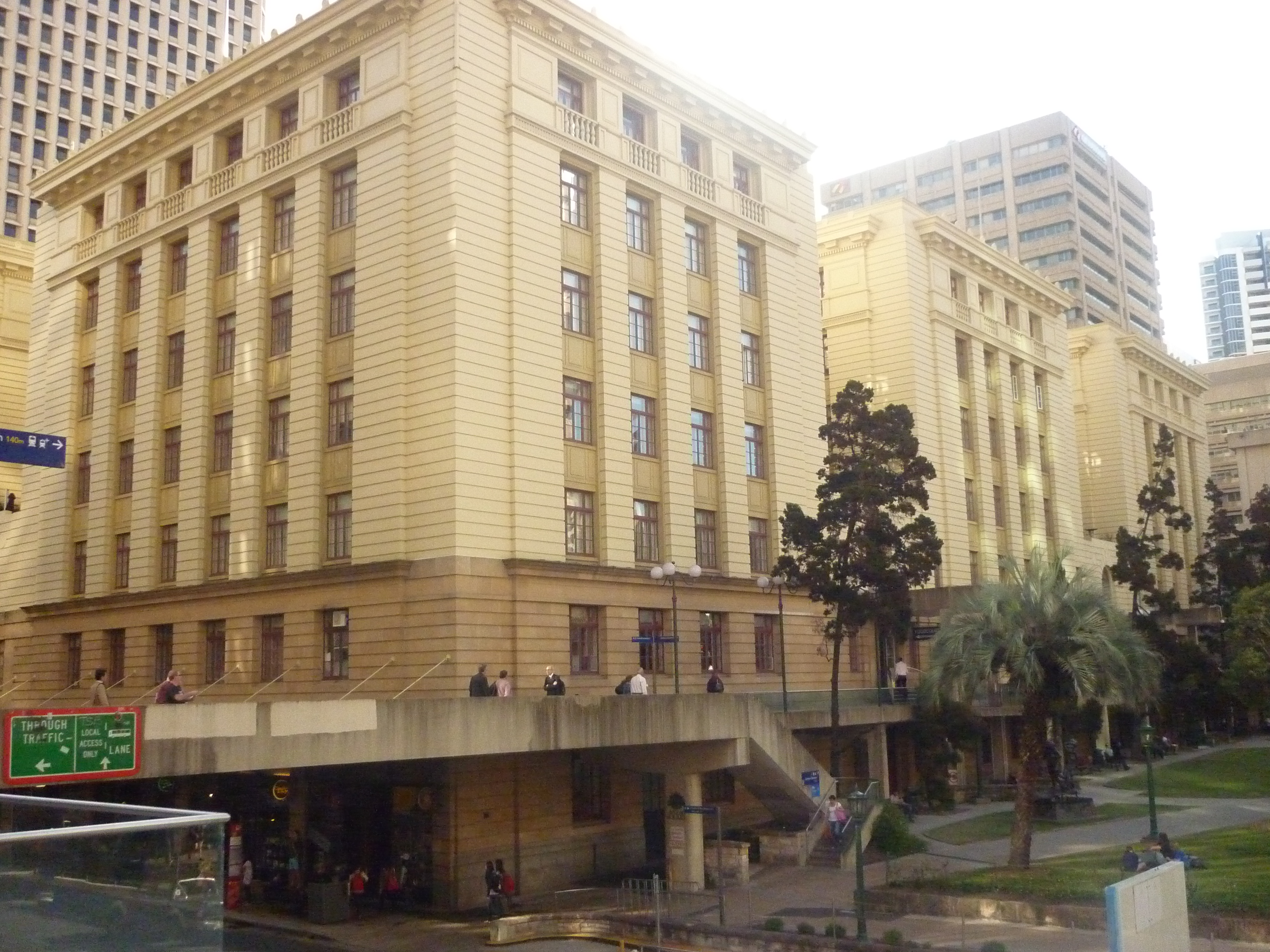
Former Queensland Government Offices, Brisbane, 1931–59

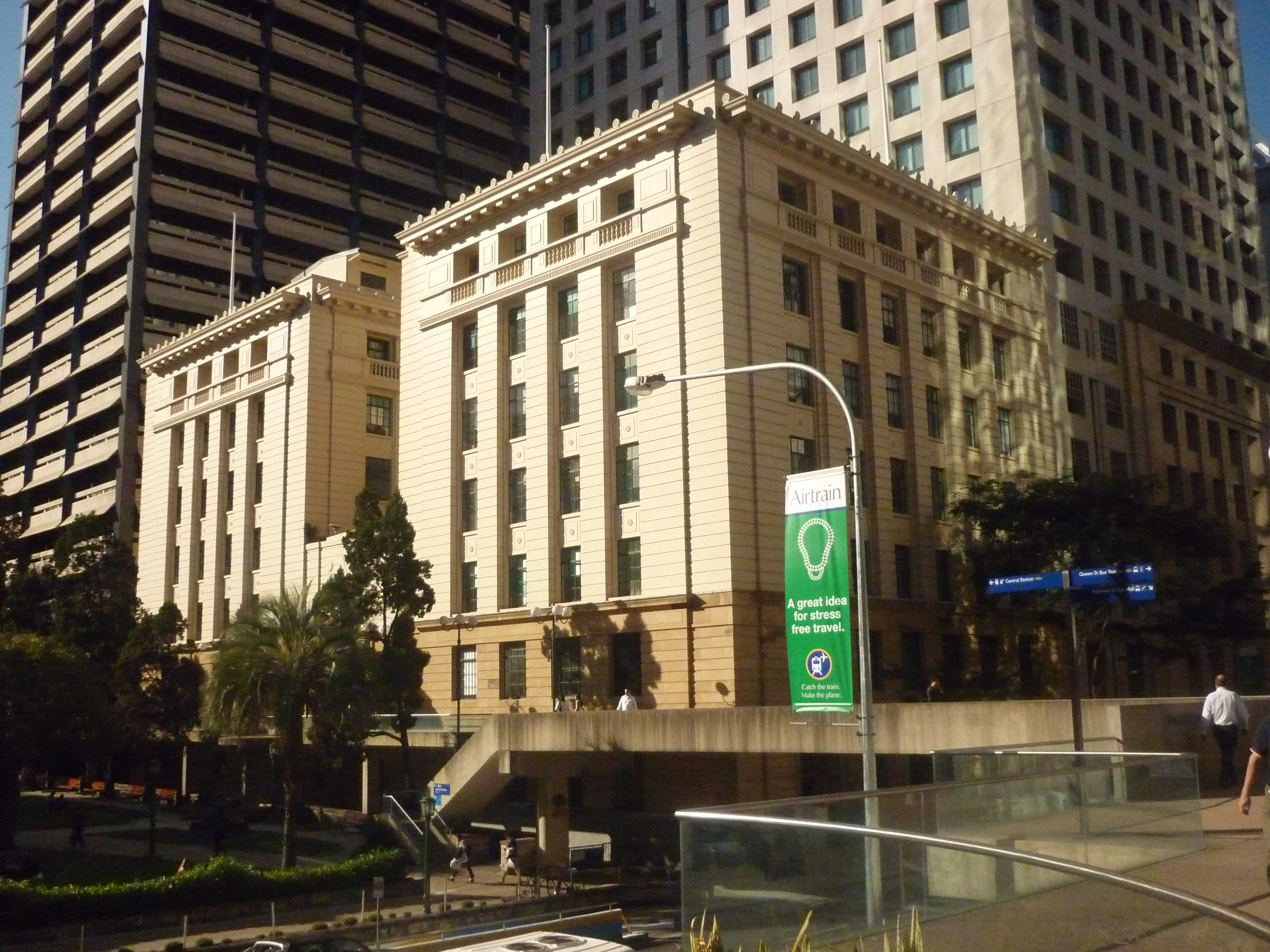
Commonwealth Government Offices, Brisbane, 1933–36
