= Hotel Canberra =

Hotel in Canberra, Australia

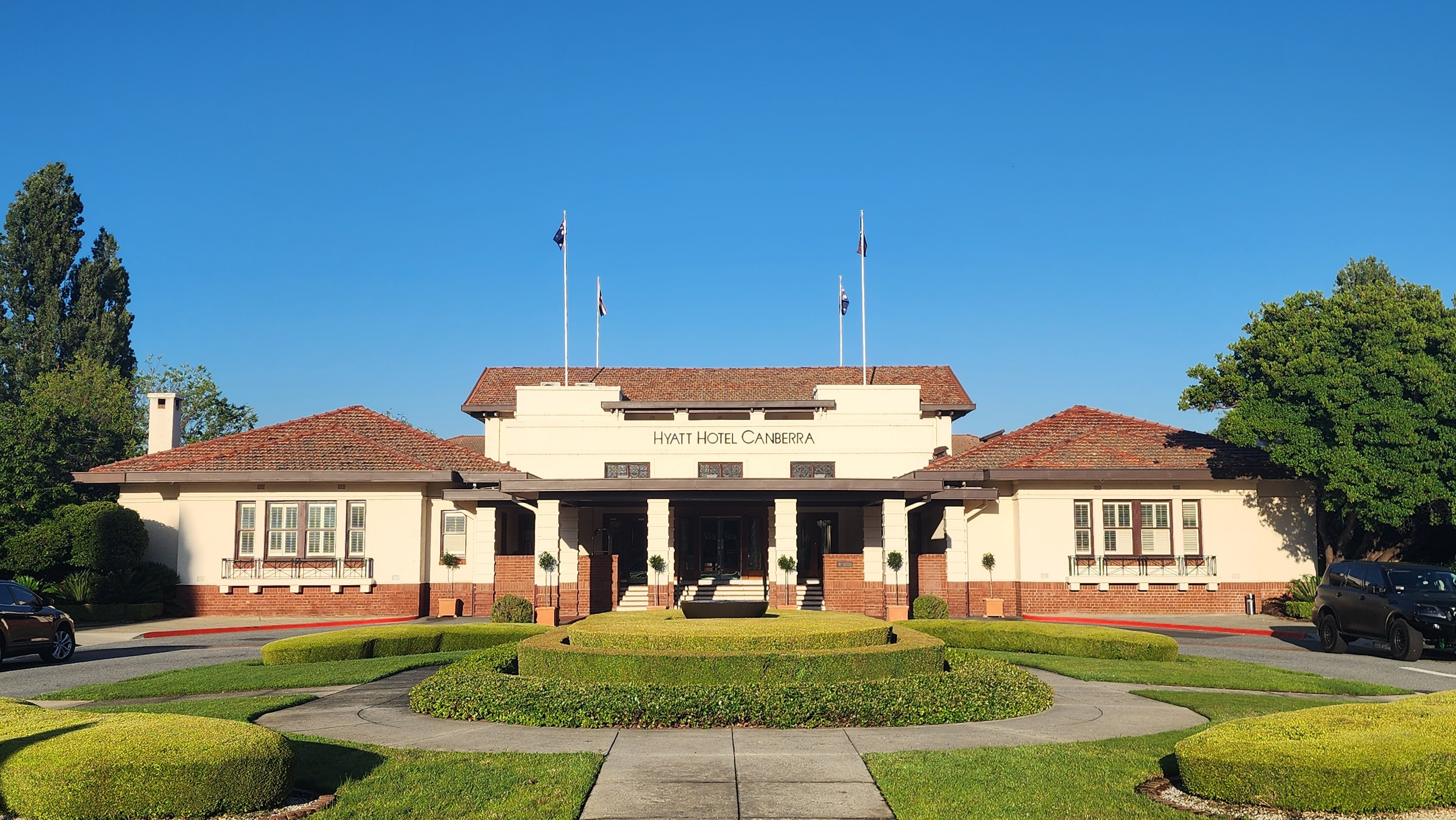
- Entrance of the Hyatt Hotel Canberra
- Interactive map of the Hotel Canberra area

General information
- Location: 120 Commonwealth Avenue, Canberra, Australian Capital Territory
- Coordinates: 35.299°S 149.125°E
- Opening: 1924
- Operator: Hyatt

Technical details
- Floor count: 2

Design and construction
- Architect: John Smith Murdoch
- Developer: Federal Capital Commission

Other information
- Number of rooms: 230
- Number of restaurants: 2

Website
- https://www.hyatt.com/en-US/hotel/australia/hyatt-hotel-canberra-a-park-hyatt-hotel/canbe

The Hotel Canberra, also known as the Hyatt Hotel Canberra, is a historic hotel in the Australian national capital, Canberra. It is located in the suburb of Yarralumla, near Lake Burley Griffin and Parliament House. It was built to house parliamentarians when the Federal Parliament moved to Canberra from Melbourne in 1927, and was constructed by the contractor John Howie between 1922–1925. Originally opened in 1924 as Hostel No. 1, in 1927 it was renamed as the Hotel Canberra.

== History ==
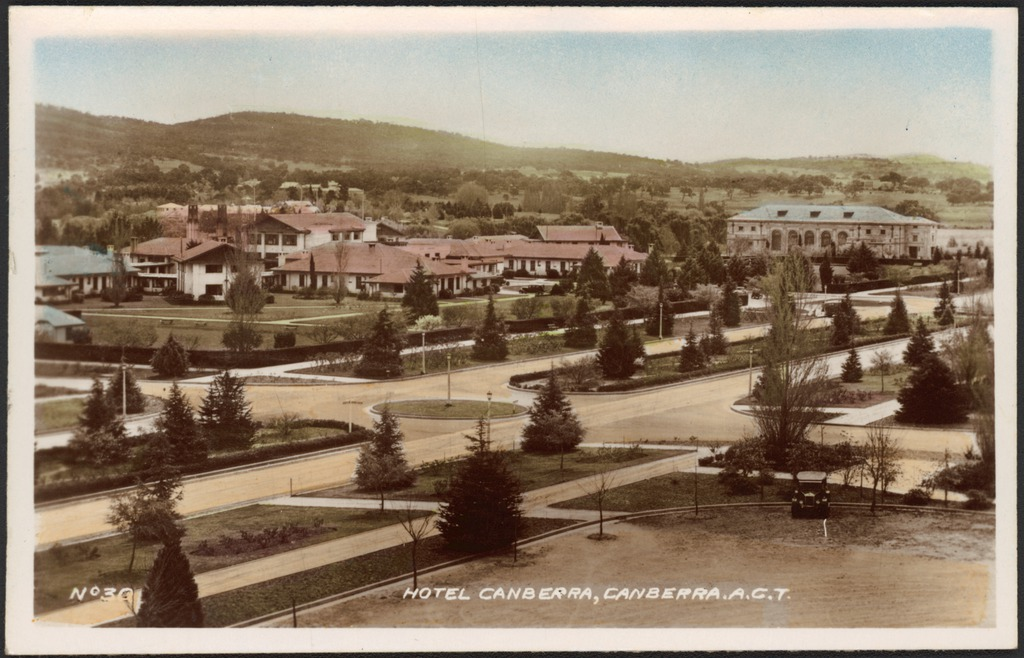
Hotel Canberra in the 1930s, with Albert Hall in the background.

The federal government decided in January 1921 to build a hostel in Canberra to accommodate politicians and visitors, in anticipation of the relocation of federal government functions from Melbourne. The hotel was designed by federal architect John Smith Murdoch, and used an unusual scheme for a hotel: pavilions arranged around garden courts. The design gave each pavilion a better outlook, and allowed it to be segregated from other pavilions while still accessible to hotel services. The building opened on 10 December 1924.

The Hotel Canberra was the first hotel to open in Canberra. It was followed shortly after, in 1926, by the Hotel Kurrajong, located on the other side of the central axis of the Parliamentary Triangle. Once the national capital moved to Canberra, a number of other hotels opened in 1927. The Hotel Canberra was not licensed to serve alcohol until 1928, which is why it was initially called a "hostel", owing to Minister for Home Affairs King O'Malley's decision to keep Canberra free of alcohol as it was being constructed.

The Canberra was frequently used as sitting-time accommodation by politicians and, in the early years, as long-term accommodation for officials while homes were still being constructed for them. The same was true at the Hotel Kurrajong, with the Kurrajong reputedly favoured by politicians from the Australian Labor Party and the Canberra by politicians from the conservative parties.

When James Scullin became Prime Minister in 1929, he refused to live in The Lodge, the official residence of the Prime Minister, and he and his wife lived at the Hotel Canberra during parliamentary sessions, and at their home in Melbourne at other times.

During the Great Depression, economic conditions and the reduction in the number of government employees reduced demand for accommodation in Canberra, and the Canberra and the Kurrajong were the only hotels left open for a time.

In 1950, the government gave up the management of the hotel and the lease was taken over by Tooheys. In 1974, the lease was not renewed and the hotel was shut down. Between 1976 and 1984, it was used as an annexe for Parliament House, providing office space for parliamentary staff.

The hotel was designated as part of the National Estate by the federal government in 1980, shortly before a project began in 1982 to restore the hotel and extend it in a sympathetic style. After several years of troubles with the backers, Hyatt reopened Hotel Canberra on 23 July 1988 as the new Hyatt Hotel Canberra, at the time the only international five-star hotel in Canberra.

On 30 September 1998, the building was added to the Interim Heritage Places Register of the Australian Capital Territory Heritage Register.

The Hyatt Hotel Canberra has been owned by Thailand-based conglomerate TCC Group, which purchased the building for AU$80 million in 2008.
