= Adelaide Street, Brisbane =

Street in Brisbane, Queensland, Australia

Adelaide Street Queensland
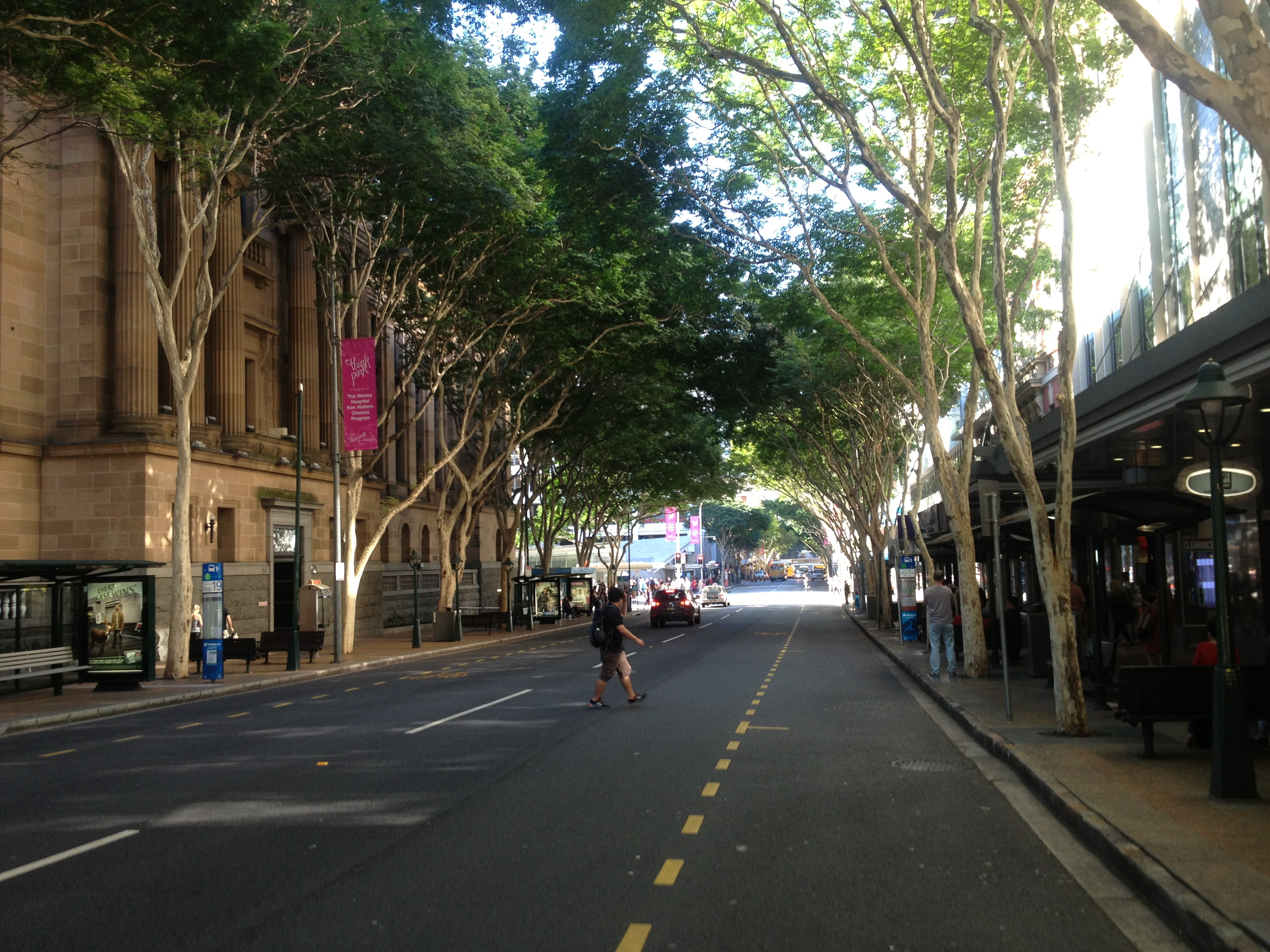
- Adelaide Street with Brisbane City Hall on the left
- Coordinates: 27.466774°S 153.027492°E

General information
- Type: Street
- Location: Brisbane
- Length: 1.4 km (0.9 mi)

Adelaide Street is a major street in the central business district of Brisbane, Queensland, Australia. It runs between North Quay on the western side of the CBD and Boundary Street in the east, parallel to Queen Street and Ann Street.

== History ==
By May 1873 there was a Primitive Methodist Church in Adelaide Street.

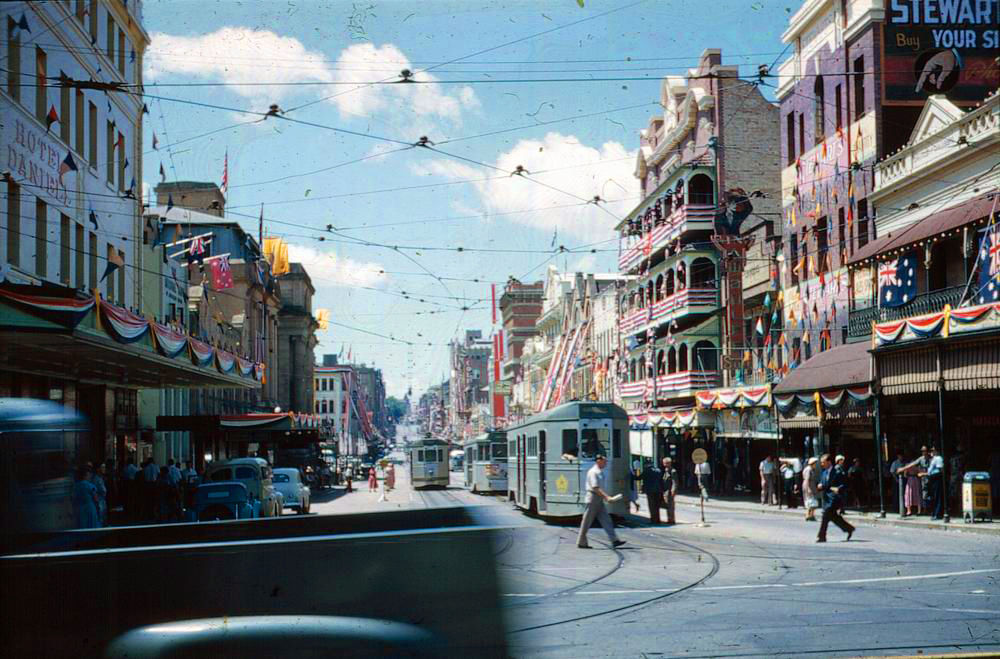
Adelaide Street in 1954, decorated for the visit of Queen Elizabeth II.

Under the provisions of the City of Brisbane Improvement Act 1916 and the Local Authorities Act Amendment Act 1923 the Brisbane City Council contributed significantly to the 1920s building boom, with a programme of city beautification and street improvements, including the cutting down and widening of several of the principal thoroughfares. From 1923 to 1928 the Brisbane City Council implemented its most ambitious town improvement scheme to that date: the widening of Adelaide Street by 14 feet (4.3 m) along its entire length. Resumptions in Adelaide Street had commenced in the 1910s, but work on the street widening did not take place until the 1920s. The work was undertaken in stages, commencing in 1923 at the southern end where the new Brisbane City Hall was under construction. Some buildings had the front section removed and a contemporary facade installed on the new road alignment. Elsewhere, earlier buildings were demolished and substantial new structures took their place. At the northern end of Adelaide Street the cutting down of the hill below St John's Cathedral in 1928 facilitated greater access to Petrie Bight, which, close to new city wharves at the end of Boundary Street, boomed in the 1920s as a warehousing district.

In 1975, Adelaide Street was extended from George Street to North Quay as construction on the Brisbane Administration Centre was underway.

In November 2021 work began on the construction of a tunnel under Adelaide Street. The tunnel provides a link between the South East Busway and the Inner-Northern Busway for Brisbane Metro vehicles and buses.

== Heritage listings ==
A number of locations on Adelaide Street are listed on the Queensland Heritage Register, including:

- 64 Adelaide Street: Brisbane City Hall
- 228 Adelaide Street: ANZAC Square and South African War Memorial
- 232 Adelaide Street: Commonwealth Government Offices
- 418–420 Adelaide Street: former Castlemaine Perkins Building
- under Adelaide Street: part of former heritage listed Wheat Creek Culvert
- 160 Queen Street: Brisbane Arcade (but goes through to Adelaide Street)
- 255A Ann Street: Anzac Square Building incorporating the ANZAC Square Arcade (but extend through to Adelaide Street)
- 325 Edward Street: Rowes Building (officially located at 221 Adelaide Street, but this is an L-shaped block of land and the heritage-listed building fronts onto Edward Street)

== Cafes of Adelaide Street ==
The Atlas Café, located at Atlas Chambers, 27 Adelaide Street in Brisbane's CBD, was operated by Greek migrant George Sklavos, starting some time during the mid-1920s. Sklavos is first listed as the proprietor of the Atlas Cafe in the 1927–1928 edition of the Queensland Post Office Directory.

== Landmarks ==
Notable buildings and parks along Adelaide Street include Brisbane City Hall, King George Square, ANZAC Square with the Shrine of Remembrance (both of which honour Australia's war dead), ANZAC Square Arcade, Brisbane Square and Post Office Square.

== ANZAC Day commemorations ==
ANZAC Day parades, in which Australian war veterans (and war veterans of allied nations) march, take place in Adelaide Street, on 25 April every year, and Dawn services are held at the Shrine of Remembrance within ANZAC Square at Adelaide Street. Adelaide Street is featured on television every year on ANZAC Day, 25 April, with the ANZAC Day Dawn Service and the ANZAC Day Parade (when the full parade is telecast live, including the saluting of the veterans by the Queensland Governor near King George Square, next to Brisbane City Hall).

== Public transport ==
Adelaide Street bus mall is a hub for Brisbane's buses, with services operated under Translink. Entrances to King George Square busway station and Central station are also accessed from Adelaide Street side of King George Square and Anzac Square.

== Major intersections ==
- North Quay
- George Street
- Albert Street
- Edward Street
- Creek Street
- Wharf Street
- Queen Street
- Macrossan Street
- Boundary Street
