= Anzac Day Act =

Anzac Day Act may refer to:

- Anzac Day Act (Australia)
- Anzac Day Act (New Zealand)

== See also ==
- ANZAC (disambiguation)
