= ANZAC (disambiguation) =

ANZAC is an acronym for Australian and New Zealand Army Corps.

== Places ==
=== Australia ===
- Anzac Avenue, Brisbane
- Anzac Avenue Memorial Trees, a memorial in Beerburrum, Queensland
- Anzac Bridge, a bridge in Sydney
- Anzac Highway, Adelaide
- Anzac Memorial Park, Townsville
- Anzac Parade, Canberra
- Anzac Parade, Sydney
- Anzac Peak, Heard Island
- Anzac railway station, Melbourne
- Anzac Rifle Range, Malabar Headland
- Anzac Square, Brisbane
- Anzac Square Arcade, Brisbane
- Anzac Square Building, Brisbane

=== Canada ===
- Anzac, Alberta

=== New Zealand ===
- Anzac Avenue, Auckland
- Anzac Square and Anzac Avenue, Dunedin

=== Turkey ===
- Anzac Cove, on the Gallipoli peninsula

=== United Kingdom ===
- New Anzac-on-Sea, former name of Peacehaven, England

=== United States ===
- Anzac Village, New Mexico

== Military ==
- I ANZAC Corps
- II ANZAC Corps
- ANZAC A badge
- ANZAC Battle Group, established in September 2006
- Anzac-class frigate
- ANZAC Mounted Division
- ANZAC Squadron, a short-lived 1942 naval military command
- Anzac Memorial, a Sydney military monument
- HMAS Anzac (D59), a Battle-class destroyer
- HMAS Anzac (FFH 150), a frigate commissioned in 1996
- HMAS Anzac (G90), a Parker-class destroyer

== Events ==
- Anzac Day
  - Anzac Day Act (Australia)
  - Anzac Day Act (New Zealand)
  - Anzac Day clash
  - Anzac Test
  - Anzac Day Cup
- ANZAC Field of Remembrance

== Other uses ==
- Anzac biscuit
- Anzac spirit
- Anzacs, a 1985 Australian TV miniseries
- Baron Birdwood, of Anzac and of Totnes in the County of Devon

== See also ==
- Anzac Parade (disambiguation)
- Anzac Square (disambiguation)
