= Eustace Graham Keogh =

Australian Army officer and historian (1899–1981)

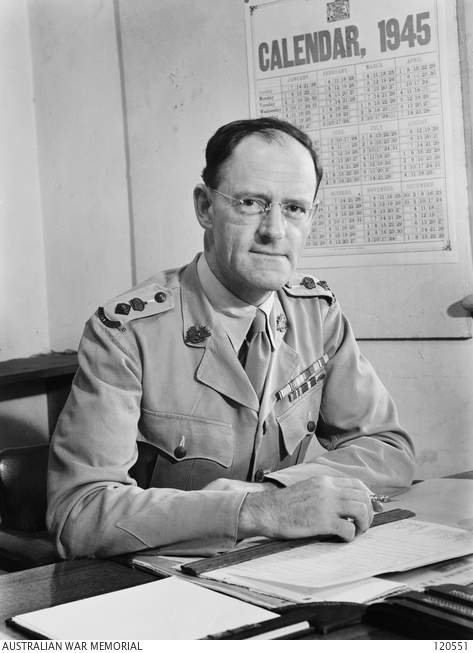
- At Victoria Barracks, Melbourne, in December 1945
- Born: 24 April 1899; Rutherglen, Victoria
- Died: 9 November 1981 (aged 82)
- Military career
- Allegiance: Australia
- Branch: Australian Army
- Service years: 1916–1946
- Rank: Colonel
- Service number: VX11986
- Conflicts: First World War; Mesopotamian campaign; Second World War; German invasion of Greece; New Guinea campaign
- Awards: Member of the Order of the British Empire; Mentioned in despatches; Efficiency Decoration; AMF Gold Medal Essay (1931, 1937, 1948)

Eustace Graham Keogh, MBE, ED (24 April 1899 – 9 November 1981) was an Australian Army officer and military historian who served in First and Second World Wars. He won the AMF Gold Medal Essay three times, and was the editor of the Australian Army Journal from 1948 to 1964. He published several books on the Australian Army's campaigns.

== Early life ==
Eustace Graham Keogh was born in Rutherglen, Victoria, on 24 April 1899, the second son of Arthur Graham Keogh, a medical practitioner. He was educated at Christian Brothers College, East Melbourne. On 13 May 1916, he volunteered to serve in the Australian Imperial Force, raising his age by a year. At age 18, he still needed parental permission. His father endorsed the attestation form on condition that he did not leave Australia until he was 19. The Army ignored this.

Keogh was sent to Broadmeadows, Victoria, where he trained as a signaller. He was assigned to the 1st Australian Wireless Signal Squadron, and embarked for Iraq on the RMS Malwa on 25 July 1916, joining his unit as Basra on 28 August. He was evacuated to hospital in India on 11 September, but returned to duty with his unit on 1 March 1917. He served in Iraq and Iran until the end of the war, embarking for Australia on the SS Janus on 26 February 1919. On 15 April 1919, he reached Melbourne, where he was discharged from the Army with the rank of sapper on 25 May 1919. He was awarded the British War Medal and the Victory Medal, but his application for the General Service Medal was declined, as he was not in Iraq during the eligibility period, which was after 14 July 1919.

On 21 October 1922, Keogh married Freda Evelyn Mikkelsen. He qualified as a civil engineer and surveyor, and was commissioned as a lieutenant in the 24th Battalion, a part-time Militia unit, on 22 November 1924. He was promoted to captain on 27 September 1929, and major on 5 November 1935. He won the AMF Gold Medal Essay in 1931, and again in 1937. On 21 April 1939, he was appointed Deputy Assistant Adjutant General (DAAG) of the 3rd Division.

== Second World War ==
Keogh joined the Second Australian Imperial Force on 17 April 1940 as a captain, and was given the AIF service number VX11986. He initially served as with the 7th Division headquarters (HQ) as its camp commandant. He became a major in the 2/24th Battalion when it was formed on 15 July, and embarked for the Middle East on the RMS Mauretania on 20 October 1940. On arrival he was sent to the Middle East Tactical School, where he attended the Staff Liaison Course, and was graded "distinguished". He was then posted back to 7th Division HQ as a GSO2. On 4 March 1941, he was transferred to I Corps HQ as a liaison officer, and served in this capacity during the Battle of Greece. He was evacuated sick to the 2nd General Hospital in July 1941, and when he was discharged in November, he became a GSO2 with the AIF Middle East HQ. For his service in Greece, he was mentioned in despatches on 16 April 1942.

On 9 August 1942, Keogh embarked on the MS Skjelbred to return to Australia, arriving in Adelaide on 11 September. He was assigned to the Advanced Headquarters, Allied Land Forces, South West Pacific Area, (LHQ) as a GSO2 in the G Branch Directorate of Military Training. He became the GSO I (Staff Duties) on 20 October, and was promoted to the temporary rank of lieutenant colonel on 30 October. He was awarded the Efficiency Decoration on 6 May 1943. He was seconded to General Headquarters (GHQ) as the Regulating Officer in Lae on 17 November 1943, travelling to New Guinea by air. He returned to Australia on 27 February 1944, and was appointed GSO1 (Staff Duties and Training) at Second Army HQ on 6 April 1944. On 12 February 1945, he returned to LHQ as GSO1 (Military Training). He was discharged from the Army on 18 April 1946, and was placed on the retired list. For his services, he was awarded the 1939–1945 Star, the Africa Star, the Pacific Star, Defence Medal, War Medal 1939–1945 and the Australia Service Medal 1939–1945. He was given the honorary rank of colonel in the Australian Infantry Corps on 1 July 1951.

== Military historian ==
Keogh returned to the Directorate of Military Training as a civilian employee. In 1948 he became the editor of the Australian Army Journal, which published its first issue in June 1948. That year he won the AMF Gold Medal Essay for the third time. He remained the editor until 1964. He wrote articles for the journal as well as editing it, and published five books on the Australian Army's campaigns in the First and Second World Wars, and one on the Shenandoah Valley Campaign of 1862 in the American Civil War. The Army decided that this would be the subject of examination in 1952, and as there were few sources available, Keogh wrote one. Interest was low, and only the last book, South West Pacific, 1941–1945 attracted a mainstream commercial publisher. He was made a Member of the Order of the British Empire "in recognition for outstanding public service" in the 1957 New Year Honours.

In retirement, Keogh was the technical advisor to the television series, The Sullivans, about the experiences of an Australian family during and immediately after the Second World War. He died on 9 November 1981. In 2014, the E.G. Keogh Visiting Chair was named in his memory. It provides for an annual visit by a selected eminent academic in strategic or war studies in order to increase the profile of debate on land warfare issues in Australia. Jeffrey Grey wrote that Keogh:

... was not the first army officer to recognise the importance of education and serious and sustained study in the development of the officer corps. He was not the first army officer to write serious history, although he was probably the most prolific of his time. The journal of the profession of arms that he established and edited for nearly two decades was not the first such publication in Australia, although it was easily the most sustained and wide-ranging. What makes Keogh worth of note and explains his influence within the army of his day was that he did all of trhese things and did so for an extended period of time.

== Bibliography ==
- Suez to Aleppo (1954)
- Shenandoah 1861–62 (1954)
- The River in the Desert (1955)
- Middle East 1939–43 (1959)
- Malaya 1941–42 (1962)
- South West Pacific, 1941–1945 (1965)
