= List of Australian Army engineer units in World War I =

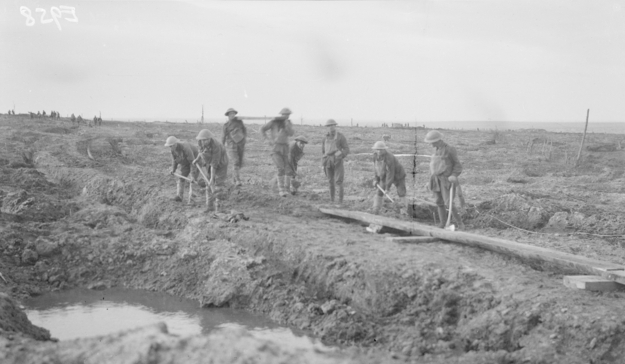
Australian engineers laying down a mule track and camouflaging it with earth at Albania Woods, in the Ypres Sector, 17 October 1917.

The Australian Imperial Force included a range of different engineer units including field units, signals, mining, works, railway, survey and training units.

== Field units ==
- 1st Division Engineers
  - 1st Field Company
  - 2nd Field Company
  - 3rd Field Company
- 2nd Divisional Engineers
  - 5th Field Company
  - 6th Field Company
  - 7th Field Company
- 3rd Divisional Engineers
  - 9th Field Company
  - 10th Field Company
  - 11th Field Company
- 4th Divisional Engineers
  - 4th Field Company
  - 12th Field Company
  - 13th Field Company
- 5th Divisional Engineers
  - 8th Field Company
  - 14th Field Company
  - 15th Field Company
- 6th Division Engineers (disbanded following formation in 1917)
  - 16th Field Company
  - 17th Field Company
- ANZAC Mounted Division Engineers
  - 1st Field Squadron
- Australian Mounted Divisional Engineers
  - 2nd Field Squadron
- Desert Mounted Corps Troops Engineers
  - 'D' Field Troop and Bridging Train

== Signal units ==
- 1st Division Signal Company
- 2nd Divisional Signal Company
- 3rd Divisional Signal Company
- 4th Division Signal Company
- 5th Divisional Signal Company
- Australian Corps Signal Company
- 1st Signal Squadron
- 2nd Signal Squadron
- Australian Pack Wireless Section
- 1st Australian Wireless Signal Squadron
- Cavalry Divisional Signal Squadron

== Mining units ==
- 1st Tunnelling Company
- 2nd Tunnelling Company
- 3rd Tunnelling Company
- 4th Tunnelling Company (absorbed by 1st Tunneling Company)
- 5th Tunnelling Company (absorbed by 2nd Tunneling Company)
- 6th Tunnelling Company (absorbed by 3rd Tunneling Company)
- Australian Electrical and Mechanical Mining and Boring Company

== Works units ==
- 1st Army Troops Company
- Australian Corps RE Workshops

== Railway units ==
- Headquarters Australian Railway Group
- 1st Light Railway Operating Company
- 2nd Light Railway Operating Company
- 3rd Light Railway Operating Company
- 4th Broad Gauge Railway Operating Company
- 5th Broad Gauge Railway Operating Company
- 6th Broad Gauge Railway Operating Company

== Survey units ==
- Australian Corps Topographical Section

== Training units ==
- Engineer Training Depot
- Signal Section, Engineer Training Depot
- Australian Railway Operating Division Depot
- Engineer Training Depot
