= Anzac class =

The Anzac-class frigates are a ship class of ten frigates operated by the Royal Australian Navy and the Royal New Zealand Navy from 1996 to present.

Anzac class is also incorrectly used to refer to Australian-operated warships of the following ship classes:

- Parker-class leader, a class of destroyer leaders constructed during World War I
- Battle-class destroyer, a class of destroyers constructed during and after World War II

== See also ==
- ANZAC (disambiguation)
- HMAS Anzac for individual ships named Anzac
