= First Australian Imperial Force =

Expeditionary force during World War I

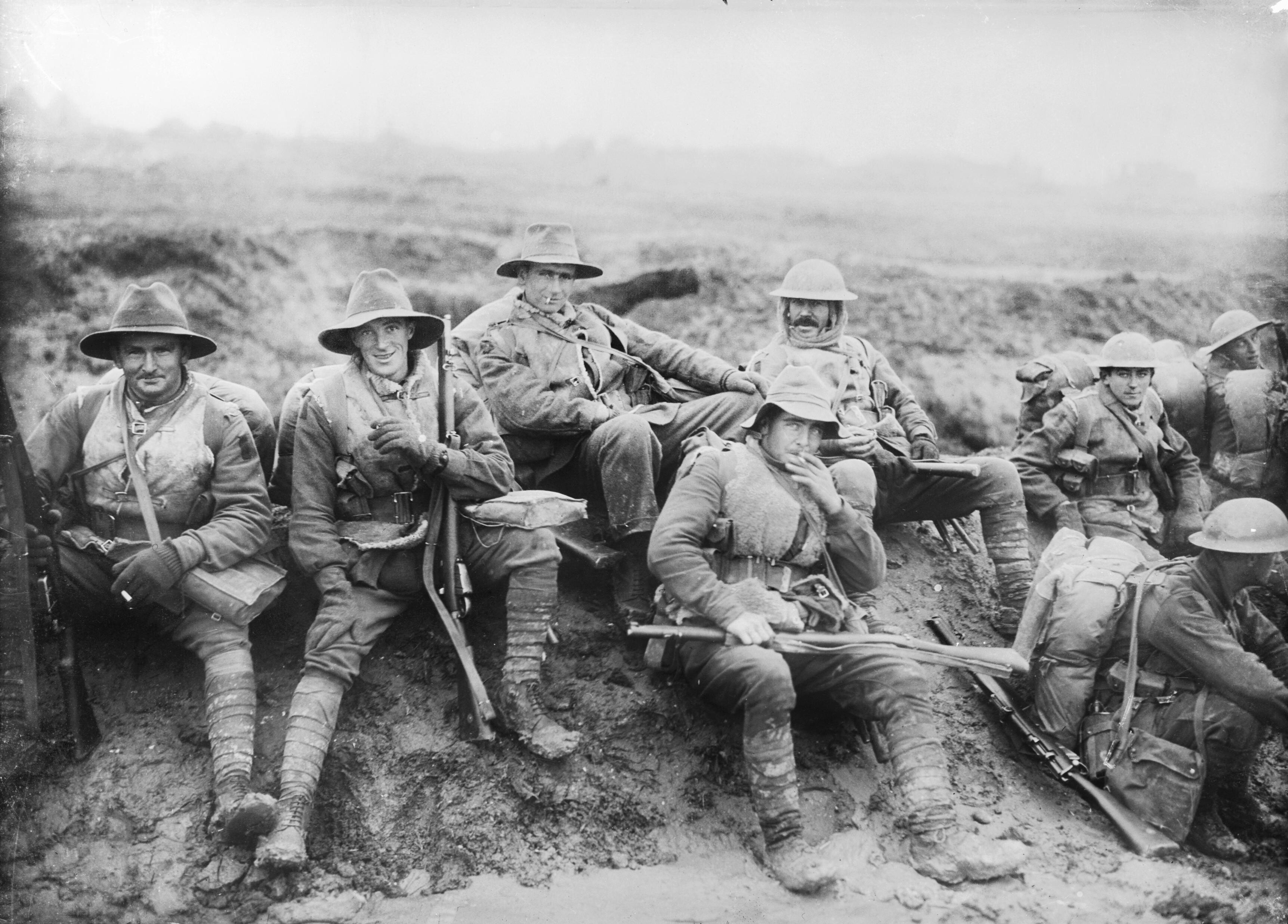
- Unidentified members of the 5th Division, enjoying a smoko near Mametz, on the Somme in France, December 1916. Some are wearing slouch hats, steel helmets and woollen garments, demonstrating both the variety of official battledress, and how it was modified, for local conditions.
- Active: 1914–1921
- Country: Australia
- Branch: Australian Army
- Role: Expeditionary warfare
- Size: 331,781 men (total)
- Nickname: 1st AIF
- Engagements: World War I: Mesopotamian campaign; Gallipoli campaign; Senussi campaign; Sinai and Palestine campaign; Western Front; Persian campaign; Caucasus campaign; Egyptian Revolution of 1919

Commanders
- Notable commanders: Major General William Bridges; General William Birdwood; Lieutenant General John Monash

The First Australian Imperial Force (1st AIF) was the main expeditionary force of the Australian Army during the First World War. It was formed as the Australian Imperial Force (AIF) on 15 August 1914 following Britain's declaration of war on Germany, with an initial strength of one infantry division and one light horse brigade. The infantry division subsequently fought at Gallipoli between April and December 1915, with a newly raised second division, as well as three light horse brigades, reinforcing the committed units.

After being evacuated to Egypt, the AIF was expanded to five infantry divisions, which were committed to the fighting in France and Belgium along the Western Front in March 1916. A sixth infantry division was partially raised in 1917 in the United Kingdom, but was broken up and used as reinforcements following heavy casualties on the Western Front. Meanwhile, two mounted divisions remained in the Middle East to fight against Turkish forces in the Sinai and Palestine. The AIF included the Australian Flying Corps (AFC), the predecessor to the Royal Australian Air Force, which consisted of four combat and four training squadrons that were deployed to the United Kingdom, the Western Front and the Middle East throughout the war.

An all volunteer force, by the end of the war the AIF had gained a reputation as being a well-trained and highly effective military force, playing a significant role in the final Allied victory. However, this reputation came at a heavy cost with a casualty rate among the highest of any belligerent for the war. The remaining troops were repatriated until the disbandment of the 1st AIF between 1919 and 1921. After the war, the achievements of the AIF and its soldiers, known colloquially as "Diggers", became central to the national mythology of the "Anzac legend". Generally known at the time as the AIF, it is today referred to as the 1st AIF to distinguish it from the Second Australian Imperial Force raised during World War II. (Note: The term "1st AIF" was in use as early as August 1914, in anticipation that a 2nd AIF would one day be formed.)

== Formation ==
At the start of the war, Australia's military forces were focused upon the part-time Militia. The small number of regular personnel were mostly artillerymen or engineers, and were generally assigned to the task of coastal defence. Due to the provisions of the Defence Act 1903, which precluded sending conscripts overseas, upon the outbreak of war it was realised that a totally separate, all volunteer force would need to be raised. The Australian government pledged to supply 20,000 men organised as one infantry division and one light horse brigade plus supporting units, for service "wherever the British desired", in keeping with pre-war Imperial defence planning. (Note: These arrangements conformed with agreements reached during the 1911 Imperial Conference.) The Australian Imperial Force (AIF) subsequently began forming shortly after the outbreak of war and was the brain child of Brigadier General William Throsby Bridges (later Major General) and his chief of staff, Major Brudenell White. Officially coming into being on 15 August 1914, the word 'imperial' was chosen to reflect the duty of Australians to both nation and empire. The AIF was initially intended for service in Europe. Meanwhile, a separate 2,000-man force—known as the Australian Naval and Military Expeditionary Force (AN&MEF)—was formed for the task of capturing German New Guinea. In addition, small military forces were maintained in Australia to defend the country from attack.

Upon formation, the AIF consisted of only one infantry division, the 1st Division, and the 1st Light Horse Brigade. The 1st Division was made up of the 1st Infantry Brigade under Colonel Henry MacLaurin, an Australian-born officer with previous part-time military service; the 2nd, under Colonel James Whiteside McCay, an Irish-born Australian politician and former Minister for Defence; and the 3rd, under Colonel Ewen Sinclair-Maclagan, a British regular officer seconded to the Australian Army before the war. The 1st Light Horse Brigade was commanded by Colonel Harry Chauvel, an Australian regular, while the divisional artillery was commanded by Colonel Talbot Hobbs. The initial response for recruits was so good that in September 1914 the decision was made to raise the 4th Infantry Brigade and 2nd and 3rd Light Horse Brigades. The 4th Infantry Brigade was commanded by Colonel John Monash, a prominent Melbourne civil engineer and businessman. The AIF continued to grow through the war, eventually numbering five infantry divisions, two mounted divisions and a mixture of other units. As the AIF operated within the British war effort, its units were generally organised along the same lines as comparable British Army formations. However, there were often small differences between the structures of British and Australian units, especially in regards to the AIF infantry divisions' support units.

Hastily deployed, the first contingent of the AIF was essentially untrained and suffered from widespread equipment shortages. In early 1915 the AIF was largely an inexperienced force, with only a small percentage of its members having previous combat experience. However, many officers and non-commissioned personnel (NCOs) had previously served in the pre-war permanent or part-time forces, and a significant proportion of the enlisted personnel had received some basic military instruction as part of Australia's compulsory training scheme. Predominantly a fighting force based on infantry battalions and light horse regiments—the high proportion of close combat troops to support personnel (e.g. medical, administrative, logistic, etc.) was exceeded only by the New Zealand Expeditionary Force (NZEF)—this fact at least partially accounted for the high percentage of casualties it later sustained. Nevertheless, the AIF eventually included a large number of logistics and administrative units which were capable of meeting most of the force's needs, and in some circumstances provided support to nearby allied units. However, the AIF mainly relied on the British Army for medium and heavy artillery support and other weapons systems necessary for combined arms warfare that were developed later in the war, including aircraft and tanks.

== Organisation ==
=== Command ===
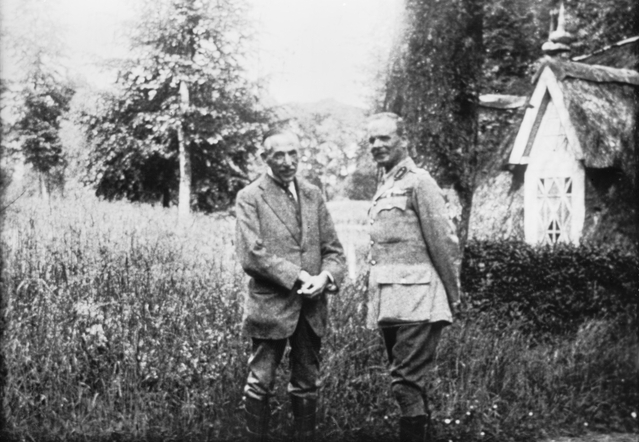
Australian Prime Minister Billy Hughes (at left) with Lieutenant-General William Birdwood in early 1916

When originally formed in 1914 the AIF was commanded by Bridges, who also commanded the 1st Division. After Bridges' death at Gallipoli in May 1915, the Australian government appointed Major General James Gordon Legge, a Boer War veteran, to replace Bridges in command of both. However, British Lieutenant General Sir John Maxwell, the commander of British Troops in Egypt, objected to Legge bypassing him and communicating directly with Australia. The Australian government failed to support Legge, who thereafter deferred to Lieutenant General William Birdwood, the commander of the Australian and New Zealand Army Corps. When Legge was sent to Egypt to command the 2nd Division, Birdwood made representations to the Australian government that Legge could not act as commander of the AIF, and that the Australian government should transfer Bridges' authority to him. This was done on a temporary basis on 18 September 1915. Promoted to major general, Chauvel took over command of the 1st Division in November when Major General Harold Walker was wounded, becoming the first Australian-born officer to command a division. When Birdwood became commander of the Dardanelles Army, command of the Australian and New Zealand Army Corps and the AIF passed to another British officer, Lieutenant General Alexander Godley, the commander of the NZEF, but Birdwood resumed command of the AIF when he assumed command of II ANZAC Corps upon its formation in Egypt in early 1916. I ANZAC Corps and II ANZAC Corps swapped designations on 28 March 1916. During early 1916 the Australian and, to a lesser extent, New Zealand governments sought the establishment of an Australian and New Zealand Army led by Birdwood which would have included all of the AIF's infantry divisions and the New Zealand Division. However, General Douglas Haig, the commander of the British Empire forces in France, rejected this proposal on the grounds that the size of these forces was too small to justify grouping them in a field army.

Birdwood was officially confirmed as commander of the AIF on 14 September 1916, backdated to 18 September 1915, while also commanding I ANZAC Corps on the Western Front. He retained overall responsibility for the AIF units in the Middle East, but in practice this fell to Godley, and after II ANZAC Corps left Egypt as well, to Chauvel who also commanded the ANZAC Mounted Division. Later promoted to lieutenant general, he subsequently commanded the Desert Mounted Corps of the Egyptian Expeditionary Force; the first Australian to command a corps. Birdwood was later given command of the Australian Corps on its formation in November 1917. Another Australian, Monash, by then a lieutenant general, took over command of the corps on 31 May 1918. Despite being promoted to command the British Fifth Army, Birdwood retained command of the AIF. By this time four of the five divisional commanders were Australian officers. The exception was Major General Ewen Sinclair-Maclagan, the commander of the 4th Division, who was a British Army officer seconded to the Australian Army before the war, and who had joined the AIF in Australia in August 1914. The vast majority of brigade commands were also held by Australian officers. A number of British staff officers were attached to the headquarters of the Australian Corps, and its predecessors, due to a shortage of suitably trained Australian officers.

=== Structure ===
==== Infantry divisions ====
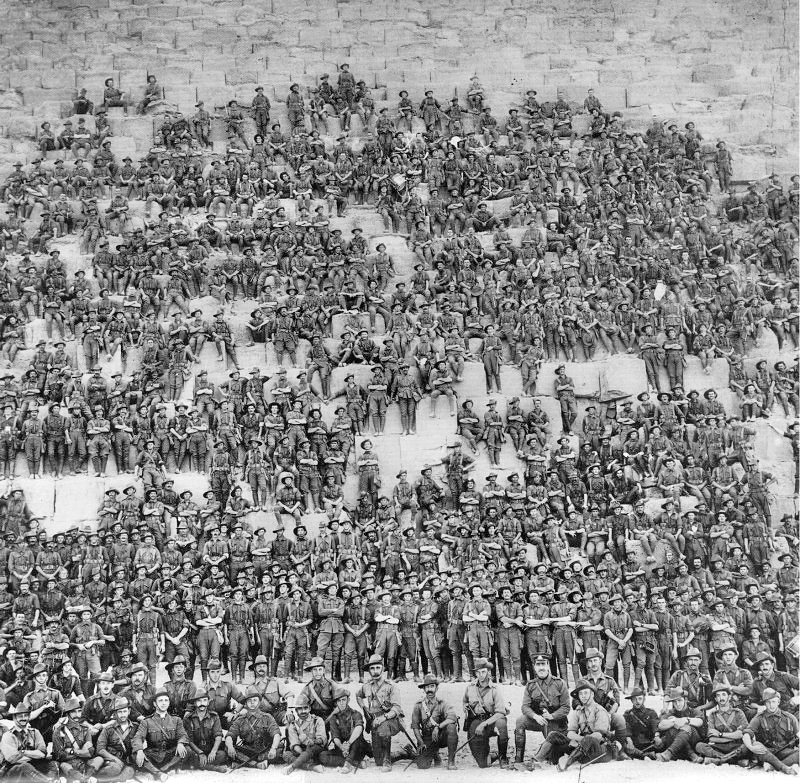
Soldiers from the 11th Battalion posing on the Great Pyramid of Giza, 1915.

The organisation of the AIF closely followed the British Army divisional structure, and remained relatively unchanged throughout the war. During the war, the following infantry divisions were raised as part of the AIF:

- 1st Division
- 2nd Division
- 3rd Division
- 4th Division
- 5th Division
- 6th Division (broken up in 1917 before seeing combat)
- New Zealand and Australian Division (1915)

Each division comprised three infantry brigades, and each brigade contained four battalions (later reduced to three in 1918). Australian battalions initially included eight rifle companies; however, this was reduced to four expanded companies in January 1915 to conform with the organisation of British infantry battalions. A battalion contained about 1,000 men. Although the divisional structure evolved over the course of the war, each formation also included a range of combat support and service units, including artillery, machine-gun, mortar, engineer, pioneer, signals, logistic, medical, veterinary and administrative units. By 1918 each brigade also included a light trench mortar battery, while each division included a pioneer battalion, a machine-gun battalion, two field artillery brigades, a divisional trench mortar brigade, four companies of engineers, a divisional signals company, a divisional train consisting of four service corps companies, a salvage company, three field ambulances, a sanitary section and a mobile veterinary section. These changes were reflective of wider organisational adaption, tactical innovation, and the adoption of new weapons and technology that occurred throughout the British Expeditionary Force (BEF).

At the start of the Gallipoli Campaign, the AIF had four infantry brigades with the first three making up the 1st Division. The 4th Brigade was joined with the sole New Zealand infantry brigade to form the New Zealand and Australian Division. The 2nd Division had been formed in Egypt in 1915 and was sent to Gallipoli in August to reinforce the 1st Division, doing so without its artillery and having only partially completed its training. After Gallipoli, the infantry underwent a major expansion. The 3rd Division was formed in Australia and completed its training in the UK before moving to France. The New Zealand and Australian Division was broken up with the New Zealand elements forming the New Zealand Division, while the original Australian infantry brigades (1st to 4th) were split in half to create 16 new battalions to form another four brigades. These new brigades (12th to 15th) were used to form the 4th and 5th Divisions. This ensured the battalions of the two new divisions had a core of experienced soldiers. The 6th Division commenced forming in England in February 1917, but was never deployed to France and was broken up in September of that year to provide reinforcements to the other five divisions.

The Australian infantry did not have regiments in the British sense, only battalions identified by ordinal number (1st to 60th). Each battalion originated from a geographical region, with men recruited from that area. New South Wales and Victoria, the most populous states, filled their own battalions (and even whole brigades) while the "Outer States"—Queensland, South Australia, Western Australia and Tasmania—often combined to assemble a battalion. These regional associations remained throughout the war and each battalion developed its own strong regimental identity. The pioneer battalions (1st to 5th, formed from March 1916) were also mostly recruited regionally; however, the machine-gun battalions (1st to 5th, formed from March 1918 from the brigade and divisional machine-gun companies) were made up of personnel from all states. (Note: The machine-gun companies usually had a state affiliation; however, this was not maintained later in the war when they were formed into battalions.)

During the manpower crisis following the Third Battle of Ypres, in which the five divisions sustained 38,000 casualties, there were plans to follow the British reorganisation and reduce all brigades from four battalions to three. In the British regimental system this was traumatic enough; however, the regimental identity survived the disbanding of a single battalion. In the Australian system, disbanding a battalion meant the extinction of the unit. In September 1918, the decision to disband seven battalions—the 19th, 21st, 25th, 37th, 42nd, 54th and 60th—led to a series of "mutinies over disbandment" where the ranks refused to report to their new battalions. In the AIF, mutiny was one of two charges that carried the death penalty, the other being desertion to the enemy. Instead of being charged with mutiny, the instigators were charged as being absent without leave (AWOL) and the doomed battalions were eventually permitted to remain together for the forthcoming battle, following which the survivors voluntarily disbanded. These mutinies were motivated mainly by the soldiers' loyalty to their battalions.

The artillery underwent a significant expansion during the war. When the 1st Division embarked in November 1914 it did so with its 18-pounder field guns, but Australia had not been able to provide the division with the howitzer batteries or the heavy guns that would otherwise have been included on its establishment, due to a lack of equipment. These shortages were unable to be rectified prior to the landing at Gallipoli where the howitzers would have provided the plunging and high-angled fire that was required due to the rough terrain at Anzac Cove. When the 2nd Division was formed in July 1915 it did so without its complement of artillery. Meanwhile, in December 1915 when the government offered to form another division it did so on the basis that its artillery would be provided by Britain. In time though these shortfalls were overcome, with the Australian field artillery expanding from just three field brigades in 1914 to twenty at the end of 1917. The majority of the heavy artillery units supporting the Australian divisions were British, although two Australian heavy batteries were raised from the regular Australian Garrison Artillery. These were the 54th Siege Battery, which was equipped with 8-inch howitzers, and the 55th with 9.2-inch howitzers.

==== Mounted divisions ====
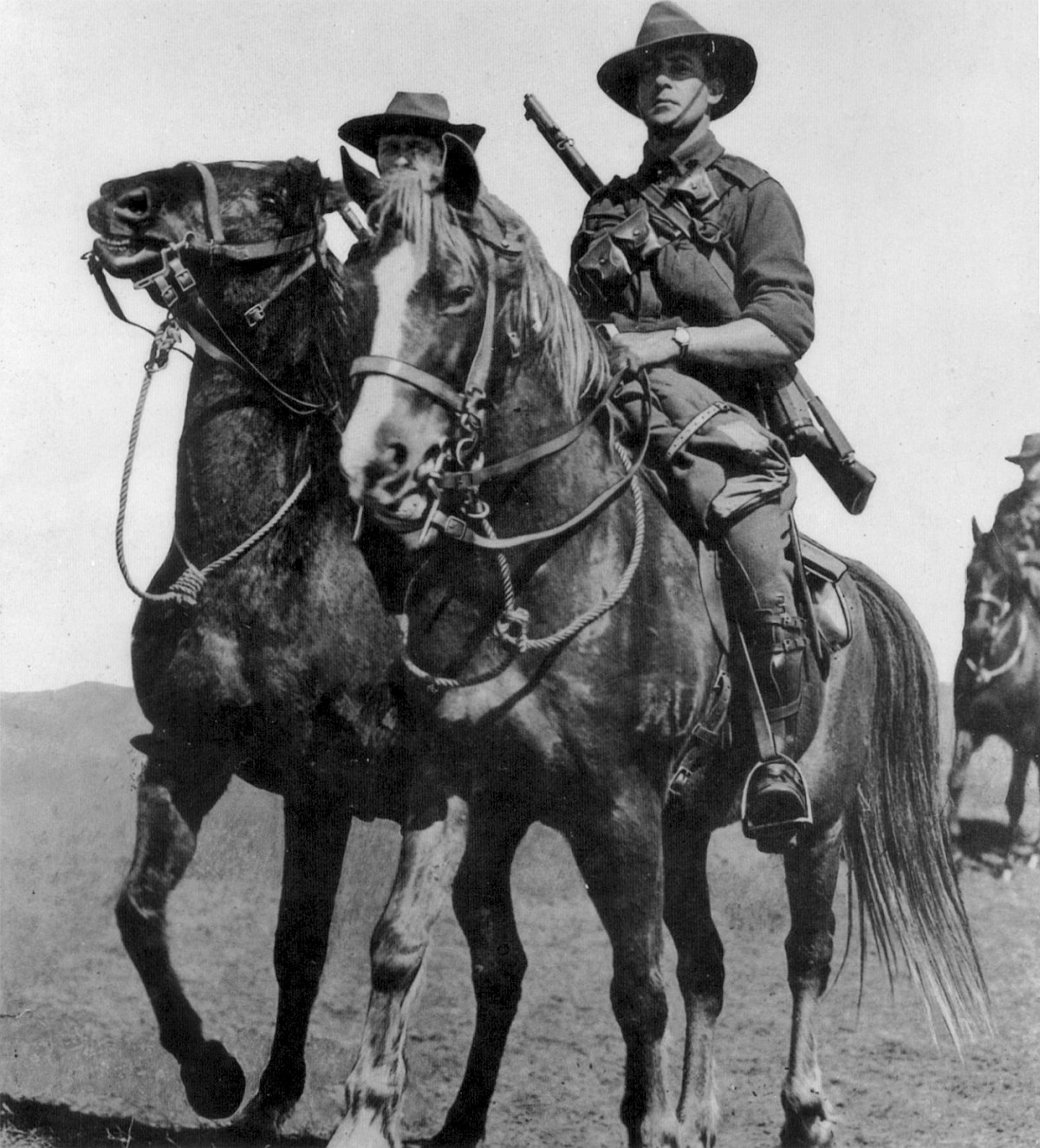
Australian light horsemen

The following mounted divisions were raised as part of the AIF:

- ANZAC Mounted Division
- Australian Mounted Division

During the Gallipoli Campaign four light horse brigades had been dismounted and fought alongside the infantry divisions. However, in March 1916 the ANZAC Mounted Division was formed in Egypt (so named because it contained one mounted brigade from New Zealand – the New Zealand Mounted Rifles Brigade). Likewise, the Australian Mounted Division—formed in February 1917—was originally named the Imperial Mounted Division because it contained the British 5th and 6th Mounted Brigades. Each division consisted of three mounted light horse brigades. A light horse brigade consisted of three regiments. Each regiment included three squadrons of four troops and a machine-gun section. The initial strength of a regiment was around 500 men, although its establishment changed throughout the war. In 1916, the machine-gun sections of each regiment were concentrated as squadrons at brigade-level. Like the infantry, the light horse regiments were raised on a territorial basis by state and were identified numerically (1st to 15th).

==== Corps ====
The following corps-level formations were raised:

- Australian and New Zealand Army Corps
- I ANZAC Corps
- II ANZAC Corps
- Australian Corps
- Desert Mounted Corps (formerly the Desert Column)

The Australian and New Zealand Army Corps (ANZAC) was formed from the AIF and NZEF in preparation for the Gallipoli Campaign in 1915 and was commanded by Birdwood. Initially the corps consisted of the 1st Australian Division, the New Zealand and Australian Division, and two mounted brigades—the Australian 1st Light Horse Brigade and the New Zealand Mounted Rifles Brigade—although when first deployed to Gallipoli in April, it did so without its mounted formations, as the terrain was considered unsuitable. However, in May, both brigades were dismounted and deployed along with the 2nd and 3rd Light Horse Brigades as reinforcements. Later, as the campaign continued the corps was reinforced further by the 2nd Australian Division, which began arriving from August 1915. In February 1916, it was reorganised into I and II ANZAC Corps in Egypt following the evacuation from Gallipoli and the subsequent expansion of the AIF.

I ANZAC Corps included the Australian 1st and 2nd Divisions and the New Zealand Division. The New Zealand Division was later transferred to the II ANZAC Corps in July 1916 and was replaced by the Australian 3rd Division in I ANZAC. Initially employed in Egypt as part of the defence of the Suez Canal, it was transferred to the Western Front in March 1916. II ANZAC Corps included the Australian 4th and 5th Divisions, forming in Egypt it transferred to France in July 1916. In November 1917 the five Australian divisions of I and II ANZAC Corps merged to become the Australian Corps, while the British and New Zealand elements in each corps became the British XXII Corps. The Australian Corps was the largest corps fielded by the British Empire in France, providing just over 10 percent of the manning of the BEF. At its peak it numbered 109,881 men. Corps troops raised included the 13th Light Horse Regiment and three army artillery brigades. Each corps also included a cyclist battalion.

Meanwhile, the majority of the Australian Light Horse had remained in the Middle East and subsequently served in Egypt, Sinai, Palestine and Syria with the Desert Column of the Egyptian Expeditionary Force. In August 1917 the column was expanded to become the Desert Mounted Corps, which consisted of the ANZAC Mounted Division, Australian Mounted Division and the Imperial Camel Corps Brigade (which included a number of Australian, British and New Zealand camel companies). In contrast to the static trench warfare that developed in Europe, the troops in the Middle East mostly experienced a more fluid form of warfare involving manoeuvre and combined arms tactics.

==== Australian Flying Corps ====
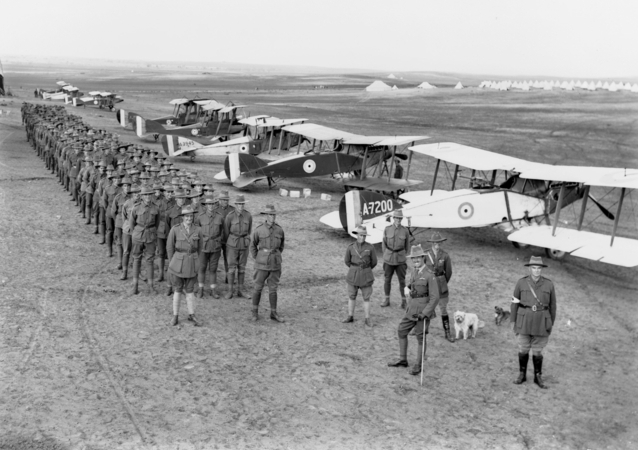
Members of No. 1 Squadron and their fighter aircraft in February 1918

The 1st AIF included the Australian Flying Corps (AFC). Soon after the outbreak of war in 1914, two aircraft were sent to assist in capturing German New Guinea. However, the colony surrendered quickly, before the planes were even unpacked. The first operational flights did not occur until 27 May 1915, when the Mesopotamian Half Flight was called upon to assist the Indian Army in protecting British oil interests in what is now Iraq. The corps later saw action in Egypt, Palestine and on the Western Front throughout the remainder of World War I. By the end of the war, four squadrons—Nos. 1, 2, 3 and 4—had seen operational service, while another four training squadrons—Nos. 5, 6, 7 and 8—had also been established. A total of 460 officers and 2,234 other ranks served in the AFC. The AFC remained part of the Australian Army until 1919, when it was disbanded; later forming the basis of the Royal Australian Air Force.

==== Specialist units ====
A number of specialist units were also raised, including three Australian tunnelling companies. Arriving on the Western Front in May 1916 they undertook mining and counter-mining operations alongside British, Canadian and New Zealand companies, initially operating around Armentieres and at Fromelles. The following year they operated in the Ypres section. In November 1916, the 1st Australian Tunnelling Company took over from the Canadians around Hill 60, subsequently playing a key role in the Battle of Messines in June 1917. During the German offensive in March 1918 the three companies served as infantry, and later supported the Allied advance being used to defuse booby traps and mines. The Australian Electrical Mining and Mechanical Boring Company supplied electric power to units in the British Second Army area.

Motor transport units were also formed. Not required at Gallipoli, they were sent on to the Western Front, becoming the first units of the AIF to serve there. The motor transport rejoined I ANZAC Corps when it reached the Western Front in 1916. Australia also formed six railway operating companies, which served on the Western Front. Specialist ordnance units included ammunition and mobile workshops units formed late in the war, while service units included supply columns, ammunition sub-parks, field bakeries and butcheries, and depot units. Hospitals and other specialist medical and dental units were also formed in Australia and overseas, as were a number of convalescent depots. One small armoured unit was raised, the 1st Armoured Car Section. Formed in Australia, it fought in the Western Desert, and then, re-equipped with T Model Fords, served in Palestine as the 1st Light Car Patrol. (Note: In March 1918, the British War Office had offered to provide all necessary equipment to the Australians to form their own tank battalion; however, this was turned down by Birdwood due to a lack of manpower.) Camel companies were raised in Egypt to patrol the Western Desert. They formed part of the Imperial Camel Corps and fought in the Sinai and Palestine. In 1918 they were converted to light horse as the 14th and 15th Light Horse Regiments.

=== Administration ===
Although operationally placed at the disposal of the British, the AIF was administered as a separate national force, with the Australian government reserving the responsibility for the promotion, pay, clothing, equipment and feeding of its personnel. The AIF was administered separately from the home-based army in Australia, and a parallel system was set up to deal with non-operational matters including record-keeping, finance, ordnance, personnel, quartermaster and other issues. The AIF also had separate conditions of service, rules regarding promotion and seniority, and graduation list for officers. This responsibility initially fell to Bridges, in addition to his duties as its commander; however, an Administrative Headquarters was later set up in Cairo in Egypt. Following the redeployment of the Australian infantry divisions to the Western Front it was relocated to London. Additional responsibilities included liaison with the British War Office as well as the Australian Department of Defence in Melbourne, whilst also being tasked with the command of all Australian troops in Britain. A training headquarters was also established at Salisbury. The AIF Headquarters and its subordinate units were almost entirely independent from the British Army, which allowed the force to be self-sustaining in many fields. The AIF generally followed British administrative policy and procedures, including for the awarding of imperial honours and awards.

== Weaponry and equipment ==
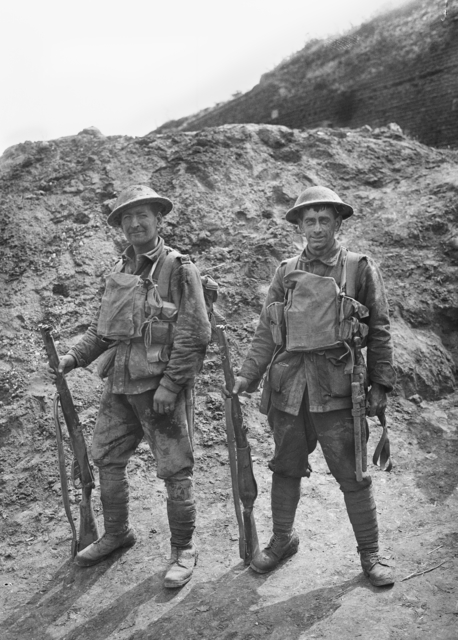
Two soldiers from the 5th Division immediately after leaving the front line in France during July 1918. The uniform and equipment of the soldier on the left, Private George Giles, has been on display at the Australian War Memorial since the 1920s.

The weaponry and equipment of the Australian Army had mostly been standardised on that used by the British Army prior to the outbreak of World War I. During the war the equipment used changed as tactics evolved, and generally followed British developments. The standard issued rifle was the .303-inch Short Magazine Lee–Enfield Mark III (SMLE). Infantrymen used 1908-pattern webbing, while light horsemen used leather bandoliers and load carriage equipment. A large pack was issued as part of marching order. In 1915 infantrymen were issued with the SMLE and long sword bayonet, while periscope rifles were also used. From 1916 they also used manufactured hand grenades and rodded rifle grenades, both of which had been in short supply at Gallipoli (necessitating the use of improvised "jam-tin" grenades). A grenade discharge cup was issued for fitting to the muzzle of a rifle for the projection of the Mills bomb from 1917. Machine-guns initially included a small number of Maxim or Vickers medium machine-guns, but subsequently also included the Lewis light machine-gun, the latter two of which were issued in greater numbers as the war continued so as to increase the firepower available to the infantry in response to the tactical problems of trench warfare. Light horse units underwent a similar process, although were issued Hotchkiss guns to replace their Lewis guns in early 1917.

From 1916 the Stokes light trench mortar was issued to infantry to replace a range of trench catapults and smaller trench mortars, whilst it was also used in a battery at brigade-level to provide organic indirect fire support. In addition, individual soldiers often used a range of personal weapons including knives, clubs, knuckle-dusters, revolvers and pistols. Snipers on the Western Front used Pattern 1914 Enfield sniper rifles with telescopic sights. Light horsemen also carried bayonets (as they were initially considered mounted infantry), although the Australian Mounted Division adopted cavalry swords in late 1917. Artillery included 18-pounders which equipped the field batteries, 4.5-inch howitzers used by the howitzer batteries, and 8-inch and 9.2-inch howitzers which equipped the heavy (siege) batteries. The 9.45-inch heavy mortar equipped a heavy trench mortar battery, while medium trench mortar batteries were equipped with the 2-inch medium mortar, and later the 6-inch mortar. Light Horse units were supported by British and Indian artillery. The main mount used by the light horse was the Waler, while draught horses were used by the artillery and for wheeled transport. Camels were also used, both as mounts and transport, and donkeys and mules were used as pack animals.

== Personnel ==
=== Recruitment ===
Enlisted under the Defence Act 1903, the AIF was an all volunteer force for the duration of the war. Australia was one of only two belligerents on either side not to introduce conscription during the war (along with South Africa). (Note: Although the AIF was the largest force not maintained by conscription during the war, its volunteer status was not unique. The 1st South African Infantry Brigade which fought on the Western Front between 1916 and 1918 was an all-volunteer force. Equally, although Britain had adopted conscription in 1916 it had not extended it to Ireland, and as a consequence the Irish divisions that served with the British Army were almost exclusively made up of volunteers. Meanwhile, many British Army units were also predominately volunteers, including the Pals battalions of Kitchener's Army.) Although a system of compulsory training had been introduced in 1911 for home service, under Australian law it did not extend to overseas service. In Australia, two plebiscites on using conscription to expand the AIF were defeated in October 1916 and December 1917, thereby preserving the volunteer status but stretching the AIF's reserves towards the end of the war. A total of 416,809 men enlisted in the Army during the war, representing 38.7 percent of the white male population aged between 18 and 44. Of these, 331,781 men were sent overseas to serve as part of the AIF. (Note: According to the Australian War Memorial 412,953 men enlisted in the AIF and another 3,651 in the AN&MEF. Total embarkations included 331,781 who served overseas with the AIF, and 3,011 men with the AN&MEF. Of those enlisted, 83,000 men were not sent overseas. The most common reason for this was due to being discharged in Australia for medical reasons; however, some deserted or were otherwise considered unsuitable, or the war ended before they departed.) Approximately 18 percent of those who served in the AIF had been born in the United Kingdom, marginally more than their proportion of the Australian population, although almost all enlistments occurred in Australia, with only 57 people being recruited from overseas. Indigenous Australians were officially barred from the AIF until October 1917, when the restrictions were altered to allow so-called "half-castes" to join. Estimates of the number of Indigenous Australians who served in the AIF differ considerably, but are believed to be over 500. (Note: As examples of the differing estimates, The Oxford Companion to Australian Military History states that "approximately 400 to 500 Aboriginal soldiers served as enlisted soldiers", the Anzac Centenary Victoria website gives a figure of "between 800 and 1,000" and the Australian War Memorial's website states that "over 1,300 of Australia's Indigenous population, are known to have enlisted".) More than 2,000 women served with the AIF, mainly in the Australian Army Nursing Service.

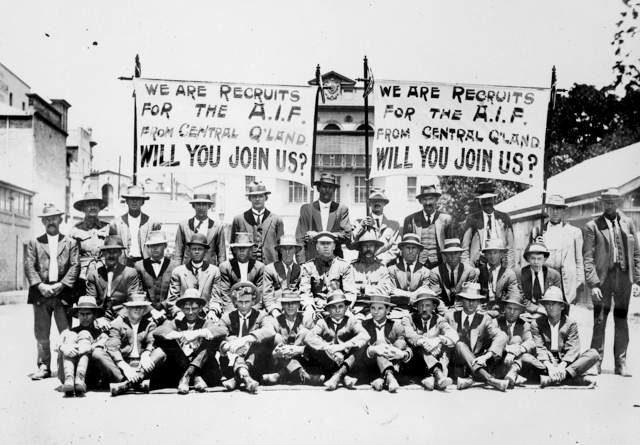
A group of AIF volunteers from Rockhampton after arriving in Brisbane to start their training

The recruitment process was managed by the various military districts. At the outset it had been planned to recruit half the AIF's initial commitment of 20,000 personnel from Australia's part-time forces, and volunteers were initially recruited from within designated regimental areas, thus creating a linkage between the units of the AIF and the units of the home service Militia. In the early stages of mobilisation the men of the AIF were selected under some of the toughest criterion of any army in World War I and it is believed that roughly 30 percent of men that applied were rejected on medical grounds. To enlist, men had to be aged between 18 and 35 years of age (although it is believed that men as old as 70 and as young as 14 managed to enlist), and they had to be at least 5 feet 6 inches (168 cm), with a chest measurement of at least 34 inches (86 cm). Many of these strict requirements were lifted later in the war, however, as the need for replacements grew. Indeed, casualties among the initial volunteers were so high, that of the 32,000 original soldiers of the AIF only 7,000 would survive to the end of the war.

By the end of 1914 around 53,000 volunteers had been accepted, allowing a second contingent to depart in December. Meanwhile, reinforcements were sent at a rate of 3,200 men per month. The landing at Anzac Cove subsequently resulted in a significant increase in enlistments, with 36,575 men being recruited in July 1915. Although this level was never again reached, enlistments remained high in late 1915 and early 1916. From then a gradual decline occurred, and whereas news from Gallipoli had increased recruitment, the fighting at Fromelles and Pozieres did not have a similar effect, with monthly totals dropping from 10,656 in May 1916 to around 6,000 between June and August. Significant losses in mid-1916, coupled with the failure of the volunteer system to provide sufficient replacements, resulted in the first referendum on conscription, which was defeated by a narrow margin. Although there was an increase in enlistments in September (9,325) and October (11,520), in December they fell to the lowest total of the year (2,617). Enlistments in 1917 never exceeded 4,989 (in March). Heavy losses at Passchendaele resulted in a second referendum on conscription, which was defeated by an even greater margin. Recruitment continued to decline, reaching a low in December (2,247). Monthly intakes fell further in early 1918, but peaked in May (4,888) and remained relatively steady albeit reduced from previous periods, before slightly increasing in October (3,619) prior to the armistice in November.

Ultimately, the voluntary system of recruitment proved unable to sustain the force structure of the AIF, failing to provide sufficient replacements for the heavy casualties it sustained and requiring a number of units to be disbanded towards the end of the war. In mid-1918 it was decided to allow the men who had enlisted in 1914 to return to Australia for home leave, further exacerbating the manpower shortage experienced by the Australian Corps. Regardless, by the last year of the war the AIF was a long-serving force—even if it was a citizen army and not a professional one like the pre-war British Army—containing 141,557 men with more than two-years service, including, despite the heavy casualties suffered at Gallipoli in 1915 and on the Western Front in 1916 and 1917, 14,653 men who had enlisted in 1914. Battle hardened and experienced as a result, this fact partially explains the important role the AIF subsequently played in the final defeat of the German Army in 1918.

=== Pay ===
Soldiers of the AIF were among the highest paid of the war. The pay for a private was set at five shillings a day, while an additional shilling was deferred to be paid on discharge. As a result, the AIF earned the sobriquet "six bob a day tourists". Married men were required to allot two shillings a day for their dependents; however, a separation allowance was added in 1915. Reflecting the progressive nature of Australian industrial and social policy of the era, this rate of pay was intended to be equal to that of the average worker (after including rations and accommodation) and higher than that of soldiers in the Militia. In contrast, New Zealand soldiers received five shillings, while British infantrymen were initially only paid one shilling, although this was later increased to three. Junior officers in the AIF were also paid at a rate higher than those in the British Army, although senior officers were paid considerably less than their counterparts.

=== Training ===
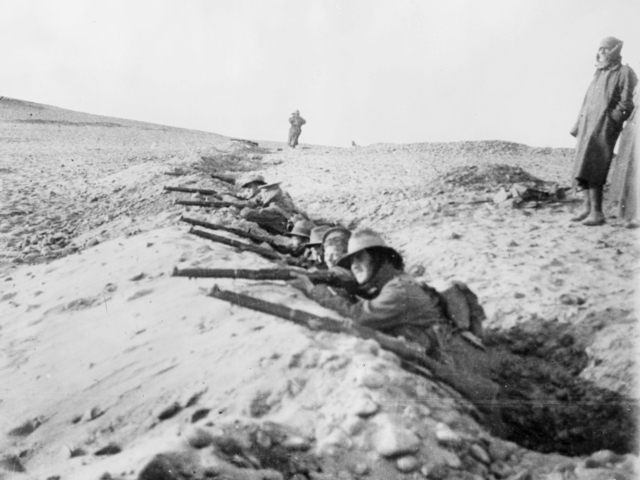
Members of the 1st Battalion undertaking rifle practice in Egypt during March 1915

In the early stages of the AIF's formation, prior to Gallipoli, training was rudimentary and performed mainly at unit-level. There were no formal schools and volunteers proceeded straight from recruiting stations to their assigned units, which were still in the process of being established. Upon arrival, in makeshift camps the recruits received basic training in drill and musketry from officers and non-commissioned officers, who were not trained instructors and had been appointed mainly because they had previous service in the part-time forces. Camps were established in every state including at Enoggera (Queensland), Liverpool (New South Wales), Broadmeadows (Victoria), Brighton (Tasmania), Morphettville (South Australia) and Blackboy Hill (Western Australia). In some units this training took place over a period of six to eight weeks, although others—such as the 5th Battalion—spent as little as one day on live firing before departing for overseas. Following the embarkation of the initial force to the Middle East, further training was undertaken in the desert. This was more organised than the training provided in Australia, but was still quite rushed. Individual training was consolidated but progressed quickly into collective training at battalion and brigade-level. Training exercises, marches, drill and musketry practices followed but the standard of the exercises was limited and they lacked realism, meaning that commanders did not benefit from handling their troops under battlefield conditions.

Some soldiers had received training through the compulsory training scheme that had been established in 1911, while others had served as volunteers in the part-time forces before the war or as members of the British Army, but their numbers were limited and in many cases the quality of the training they had received was also limited. The original intention had been that half the initial intake would consist of soldiers that were currently serving in the Militia, but ultimately this did not come to fruition and while about 8,000 of the original intake had some prior military experience, either through compulsory training or as volunteers, over 6,000 had none at all. In terms of officers, the situation was better. For example, within the 1st Division, of its initial 631 officers, 607 had had previous military experience. This was largely through service in the pre-war militia, though, where there had been little to no formal officer training. In addition, there was a small cadre of junior officers who had been trained for the permanent force at the Royal Military College, Duntroon, but their numbers were very small and at the outbreak of the war the first class had to be graduated early in order for them to join the AIF, being placed mainly in staff positions. Other than small numbers of Duntroon graduates, from January 1915 the only means to be commissioned into the AIF was from the ranks of enlisted personnel. As a result, by 1918 the majority of company and battalion commanders had risen from the ranks. While the AIF's initial senior officers had been members of the pre-war military, few had any substantial experience in managing brigade-sized or larger units in the field as training exercises on this scale had been rarely conducted before the outbreak of hostilities. This inexperience contributed to tactical mistakes and avoidable casualties during the Gallipoli campaign.

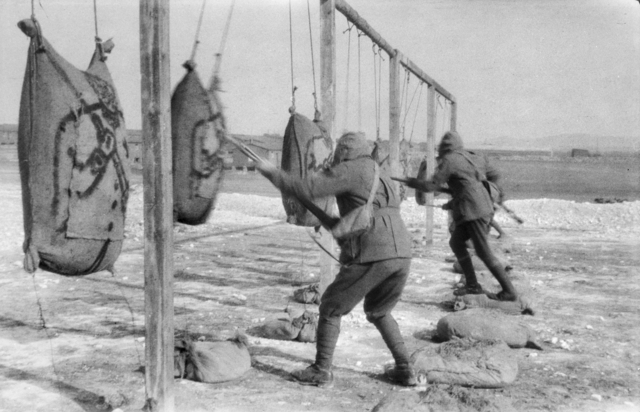
Three Australian soldiers practising bayonet attacks while wearing gas masks in England during 1916 or 1917

After the AIF was transferred to the European battlefield, the training system was greatly improved. Efforts were made at standardisation, with a formal training organisation and curriculum—consisting of 14 weeks basic training for infantrymen—being established. In Egypt, as the AIF was expanded in early 1916, each brigade established a training battalion. These formations were later sent to the United Kingdom and were absorbed into a large system of depots that was established on Salisbury Plain by each branch of the AIF including infantry, engineers, artillery, signals, medical and logistics. After completing their initial instruction at depots in Australia and the United Kingdom, soldiers were posted to in-theatre base depots where they received advanced training before being posted as reinforcements to operational units. Like the British Army, the AIF sought to rapidly pass on "lessons learned" as the war progressed, and these were widely transmitted through regularly updated training documents. The experience gained through combat also improved the skills of the surviving officers and men, and by 1918 the AIF was a very well trained and well led force. After coming to terms with the conditions on the Western Front the Australians had played a part in the development of new combined arms tactics for offensive operations that occurred within the BEF, while in defence they employed patrolling, trench raids, and Peaceful Penetration tactics to dominate no man's land.

Following the deployment of the AIF a reinforcement system was used to replace wastage. Reinforcements received training in Australia first at camps around the country before sailing as drafts—consisting of about two officers and between 100 and 150 other ranks—and joining their assigned units at the front. Initially, these drafts were assigned to specific units prior to departure and were recruited from the same area as the unit they were assigned to, but later in the war drafts were sent as "general reinforcements", which could be assigned to any unit as required. These drafts were despatched even before Gallipoli and continued until late 1917 to early 1918. Some units had as many as 26 or 27 reinforcement drafts. To provide officer reinforcements, a series of AIF officer schools, such as that at Broadmeadows, were established in Australia before officer training was eventually concentrated at a school near Duntroon. These schools produced a large number of officers, but they were eventually closed in 1917 due to concerns that their graduates were too inexperienced. After this most replacement officers were drawn from the ranks of the AIF's deployed units, and candidates attended either British officer training units, or in-theatre schools established in France. After February 1916, the issue of NCO training was also taken more seriously, and several schools were established, with training initially being two weeks in duration before being increased to two months.

=== Discipline ===
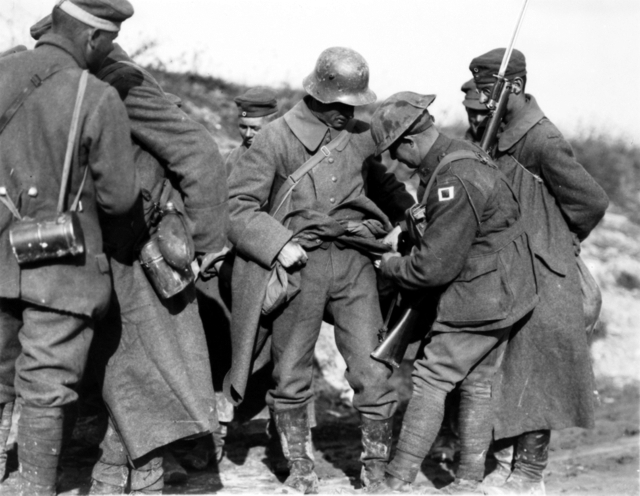
Australian soldiers searching German prisoners of war for "souvenirs" in October 1918. Australian soldiers generally treated captured Germans humanely, but routinely stole their belongings.

During the war the AIF gained a reputation, at least amongst British officers, for indifference to military authority and indiscipline when away from the battlefield on leave. This included a reputation for refusing to salute officers, sloppy dress, lack of respect for military rank and drunkenness on leave. Historian Peter Stanley has written that "the AIF was, paradoxically, both a cohesive and remarkably effective force, but also one whose members could not be relied upon to accept military discipline or to even remain in action".

Indiscipline, misbehaviour, and public drunkenness were reportedly widespread in Egypt in 1914–15, while a number of AIF personnel were also involved in several civil disturbances or riots in the red-light district of Cairo during this period. Australians also appear to have been over-represented among British Empire personnel convicted by court martial of various disciplinary offences on the Western Front from 1916, especially absence without leave. This may be partially explained by the refusal of the Australian government to follow the British Army practice of applying the death penalty to desertion, unlike New Zealand or Canada, as well as to the high proportion of front-line personnel in the AIF. (Note: Upon formation the Australian government directed that the AIF would be subject to the provisions of the British Army Act except where it was inconsistent with the Defence Act, an act of the parliament of the Commonwealth of Australia. As a consequence sentences of death passed on members of the AIF had to be referred to Australia for endorsement by the Governor General in Council before being carried out, approval which the Australian government would not give. As such while Australian soldiers could be sentenced to death, it ultimately could not be carried out. 121 Australians were sentenced to death between 1914 and 1918; however, none were executed.) Australian soldiers received prison sentences, including hard labour and life imprisonment, for desertion as well as for other serious offences, including manslaughter, assault and theft. More minor offences included drunkenness and defiance of authority. There were also examples of Australian soldiers being involved in looting, while the practice of "scrounging" or "souveniring" was also widespread.

The stresses from prolonged combat contributed to a high incidence of indiscipline within AIF units, and especially those in France during the heavy fighting between April and October 1918. The rates of personnel going absent without leave or deserting increased during 1918, and it became rare for soldiers to salute their officers in many units. Following the war, the indiscipline within the AIF was often portrayed as harmless larrikinism.

Australia's working class culture also influenced that of the AIF. Approximately three-quarters of AIF volunteers were members of the working class, with a high proportion also being trade unionists, and soldiers frequently applied their attitudes to industrial relations to the Army. Throughout the war there were incidents where soldiers refused to undertake tasks that they considered demeaning or protested against actual or perceived mistreatment by their officers. These actions were similar to the strikes many soldiers had taken part in during their pre-enlistment employment, with the men not seeing themselves as mutineers. The protests which occurred in 1918 over the planned disbandment of several battalions also used similar tactics to those employed in industrial disputes. Historian Nathan Wise has judged that the frequent use of industrial action in the AIF led to improved conditions for the soldiers, and contributed to it having a less strict military culture than was common in the British Army.

== Uniforms and insignia ==
The pre-war Australian Army uniform formed the basis of that worn by the AIF, which adopted the broad-brimmed slouch hat and rising sun badge. Peak caps were initially also worn by the infantry, while light horsemen often wore a distinctive emu plume in their slouch hats. A standard khaki puggaree was worn by all arms. From 1916 steel helmets and gas masks were issued for use by infantry on the Western Front. A loose-fitting four-pocket service dress jacket was worn, along with baggy knee breeches, puttees, and tan ankle-boots. A heavy woollen greatcoat was worn during cold weather. The uniform was a drab "pea soup" or khaki colour, while all buttons and badges were oxidised to prevent shine. All personnel wore a shoulder title bearing the word "Australia". Rank insignia followed the British Army pattern and were worn on the upper arms (or shoulders for officers). Identical hat and collar badges were worn by all units, which were initially only distinguished by small metal numerals and letters on the shoulder straps (or collars for officers). However, in 1915 a system of unit colour patches was adopted, worn on the upper arm of a soldier's jacket. Wound stripes of gold braid were also authorised to be worn to denote each wound received. Other distinguishing badges included a brass letter "A" which was worn on the colour patch by men and nurses who had served at Gallipoli, blue chevrons representing each year of overseas service, and a red chevron to represent enlistment during the first year of the war. Uniforms worn by the AFC were similar to those of the rest of the AIF, although some officers wore the double-breasted "maternity jacket" which had been worn at the pre-war Central Flying School. AFC "wings" were worn on the left breast, while an AFC colour patch and standard rising sun badges were also worn.

== Operations ==
=== Gallipoli ===
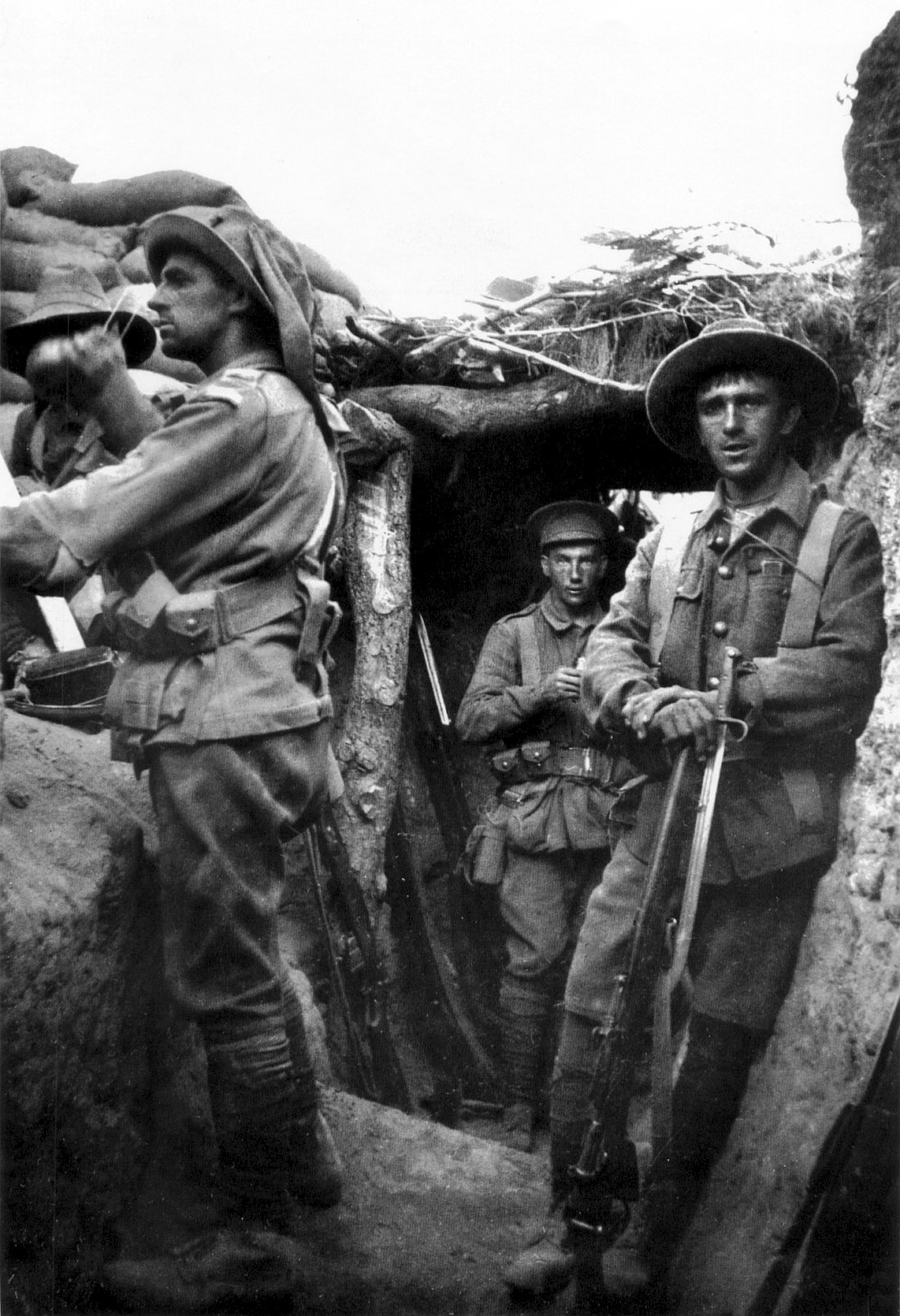
Members of the 7th Battalion in a trench at Lone Pine, 6 August 1915

The first contingent of the AIF departed by ship in a single convoy from Fremantle, Western Australia and Albany on 1 November 1914. Although they were originally bound for England to undergo further training prior to employment on the Western Front, the Australians were subsequently sent to British-controlled Egypt to pre-empt any Turkish attack against the strategically important Suez Canal, and with a view to opening another front against the Central Powers. Aiming to knock the Ottoman Empire out of the war the British then decided to stage an amphibious lodgement at Gallipoli and following a period of training and reorganisation the Australians were included amongst the British, Indian and French forces committed to the campaign. The combined Australian and New Zealand Army Corps—commanded by British general William Birdwood—subsequently landed at Anzac Cove on the Gallipoli peninsula on 25 April 1915. Although promising to transform the war if successful, the Gallipoli Campaign was ill-conceived and shortly after the landing a bloody stalemate developed. This ultimately lasted eight months before Allied commanders decided to evacuate the troops without having achieved the campaign's objectives. Australian casualties totalled 26,111, including 8,141 killed.

=== Egypt and Palestine ===
After the withdrawal from Gallipoli the Australians returned to Egypt and the AIF underwent a major expansion. In 1916, the infantry began to move to France while the mounted infantry units remained in the Middle East to fight the Turks. Australian troops of the ANZAC Mounted Division and the Australian Mounted Division saw action in all the major battles of the Sinai and Palestine Campaign, playing a pivotal role in fighting the Turkish troops that were threatening British control of Egypt. The Australians first saw combat during the Senussi Uprising in the Libyan Desert and the Nile Valley, during which the combined British forces successfully put down the pro-Turkish Islamic sect with heavy casualties. The ANZAC Mounted Division subsequently saw considerable action in the Battle of Romani between 3 and 5 August 1916 against the Turks who were eventually pushed back. Following this victory the British forces went on the offensive in the Sinai, although the pace of the advance was governed by the speed by which the railway and water pipeline could be constructed from the Suez Canal. Rafa was captured on 9 January 1917, while the last of the small Turkish garrisons in the Sinai were eliminated in February.

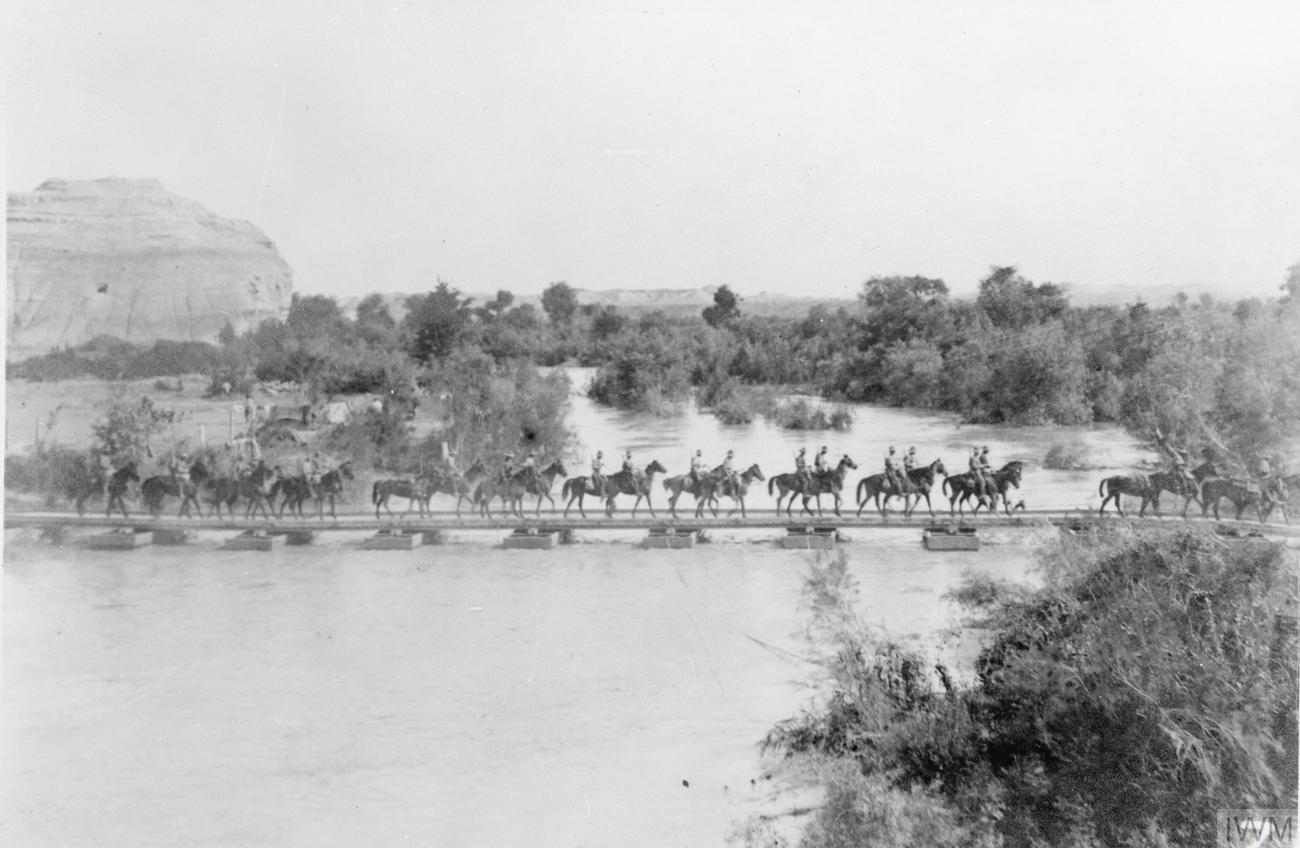
The 5th Light Horse Brigade crosses the Ghoraniyeh bridge, Jordan River, April 1918, during the Sinai and Palestine Campaign

The advance entered Palestine and an initial, unsuccessful attempt was made to capture Gaza on 26 March 1917, while a second and equally unsuccessful attempt was launched on 19 April. A third assault occurred between 31 October and 7 November and this time both the ANZAC Mounted Division and the Australian Mounted Division took part. The battle was a complete success for the British, over-running the Gaza–Beersheba line and capturing 12,000 Turkish soldiers. The critical moment was the capture of Beersheba on the first day, after the Australian 4th Light Horse Brigade charged more than 4 miles (6 km). The Turkish trenches were overrun, with the Australians capturing the wells at Beersheba and securing the valuable water they contained along with over 700 prisoners for the loss of 31 killed and 36 wounded. Later, Australian troops assisted in pushing the Turkish forces out of Palestine and took part in actions at Mughar Ridge, Jerusalem and the Megiddo. The Turkish government surrendered on 30 October 1918. Units of the Light Horse were subsequently used to help put down a nationalist revolt in Egypt in 1919 and did so with efficiency and brutality, although they suffered a number of fatalities in the process. Total Australian battle casualties in the campaign were 4,851, including 1,374 dead.

=== Western Front ===
Five infantry divisions of the AIF saw action in France and Belgium, leaving Egypt in March 1916. I ANZAC Corps subsequently took up positions in a quiet sector south of Armentières on 7 April 1916 and for the next two and a half years the AIF participated in most of the major battles on the Western Front, earning a formidable reputation. Although spared from the disastrous first day of the Battle of the Somme, within weeks four Australian divisions had been committed. The 5th Division, positioned on the left flank, was the first in action during the Battle of Fromelles on 19 July 1916, suffering 5,533 casualties in a single day. The 1st Division entered the line on 23 July, assaulting Pozières, and by the time that they were relieved by the 2nd Division on 27 July, they had suffered 5,286 casualties. Mouquet Farm was attacked in August, with casualties totalling 6,300 men. By the time the AIF was withdrawn from the Somme to reorganise, they had suffered 23,000 casualties in just 45 days.

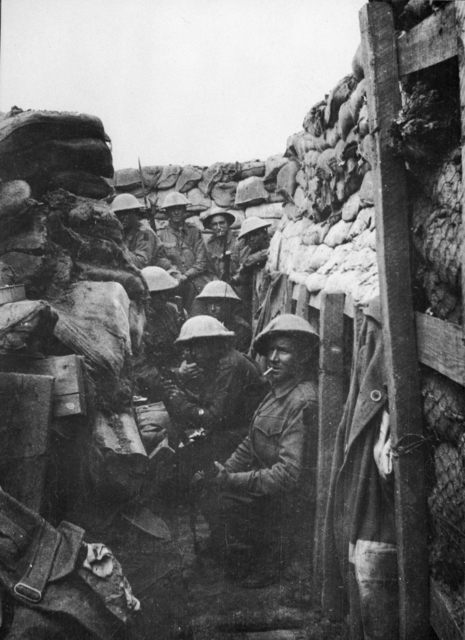
Members of the 53rd Battalion prior to the Battle of Fromelles; three of the men survived the battle, all wounded

In March 1917, the 2nd and 5th Divisions pursued the Germans back to the Hindenburg Line, capturing the town of Bapaume. On 11 April, the 4th Division assaulted the Hindenburg Line in the disastrous First Battle of Bullecourt, losing over 3,000 casualties and 1,170 captured. On 15 April, the 1st and 2nd Divisions were counter-attacked near Lagnicourt and were forced to abandon the town, before recapturing it. The 2nd Division then took part in the Second Battle of Bullecourt, beginning on 3 May, and succeeded in taking sections of the Hindenburg Line and holding them until relieved by the 1st Division. Finally, on 7 May the 5th Division relieved the 1st, remaining in the line until the battle ended in mid-May. Combined, these efforts cost 7,482 Australian casualties.

On 7 June 1917, II ANZAC Corps—along with two British corps—launched an operation in Flanders to eliminate a salient south of Ypres. The attack commenced with the detonation of a million pounds (454,545 kg) of explosives that had been placed underneath the Messines ridge, destroying the German trenches. The advance was virtually unopposed, and despite strong German counterattacks the next day, it succeeded. Australian casualties during the Battle of Messines included nearly 6,800 men. I ANZAC Corps then took part in the Third Battle of Ypres in Belgium as part of the campaign to capture the Gheluvelt Plateau, between September and November 1917. Individual actions took place at Menin Road, Polygon Wood, Broodseinde, Poelcappelle and Passchendaele and over the course of eight weeks of fighting the Australians suffered 38,000 casualties.

On 21 March 1918, the German Army launched its Spring Offensive in a last-ditched effort to win the war, unleashing 63 divisions over a 70-mile (110 km) front. As the Allies fell back the 3rd and 4th Divisions were rushed south to Amiens on the Somme. The offensive lasted for the next five months and all five AIF divisions in France were engaged in the attempt to stem the tide. By late May the Germans had pushed to within 50 miles (80 km) of Paris. During this time the Australians fought at Dernancourt, Morlancourt, Villers-Bretonneux, Hangard Wood, Hazebrouck, and Hamel. At Hamel the commander of the Australian Corps, Monash, successfully used combined arms—including aircraft, artillery and armour—in an attack for the first time.

The German offensive ground to a halt in mid-July and a brief lull followed, during which the Australians undertook a series of raids, known as Peaceful Penetrations. The Allies soon launched their own offensive—the Hundred Days Offensive—ultimately ending the war. Beginning on 8 August 1918 the offensive included four Australian divisions striking at Amiens. Using the combined arms techniques developed earlier at Hamel, significant gains were made on what became known as the "Black Day" of the German Army. The offensive continued for four months, and during the Second Battle of the Somme the Australian Corps fought actions at Lihons, Etinehem, Proyart, Chuignes, and Mont St Quentin, before their final engagement of the war on 5 October 1918 at Montbrehain. While these actions were successful, the Australian divisions suffered considerable casualties and by September 1918 the average strength of their infantry battalions was between 300 and 400, which was less than 50 percent of the authorised strength. The AIF was withdrawn for rest and reorganisation following the engagement at Montbrehain; at this time the Australian Corps appeared to be close to breaking as a result of its heavy casualties since August. The Corps was still out of the line when the armistice was declared on 11 November 1918. However, some artillery units continued to support British and American units into November, and the AFC maintained flying operations until the end of the war. Total Australian casualties on the Western Front numbered 181,000, including 46,000 of whom died. Another 114,000 men were wounded, 16,000 gassed, and approximately 3,850 were taken prisoners of war.

=== Other theatres ===
Small numbers of AIF personnel also served in other theatres. Australian troops from the 1st Australian Wireless Signal Squadron provided communications for British forces during the Mesopotamian Campaign. They participated in a number of battles, including the Battle of Baghdad in March 1917 and the Battle of Ramadi in September that year. Following the Russian Revolution in 1917, the Caucasus Front collapsed, leaving Central Asia open to the Turkish Army. A special force, known as Dunsterforce after its commander, Major General Lionel Dunsterville, was formed from hand-picked British officers and NCOs to organise any remaining Russian forces or civilians who were ready to fight the Turkish forces. Some 20 Australian officers served with Dunsterforce in the Caucasus Campaign and one party under Captain Stanley Savige was instrumental in protecting thousands of Assyrian refugees. Australian nurses staffed four British hospitals in Salonika, and another 10 in India.

== Disbandment ==
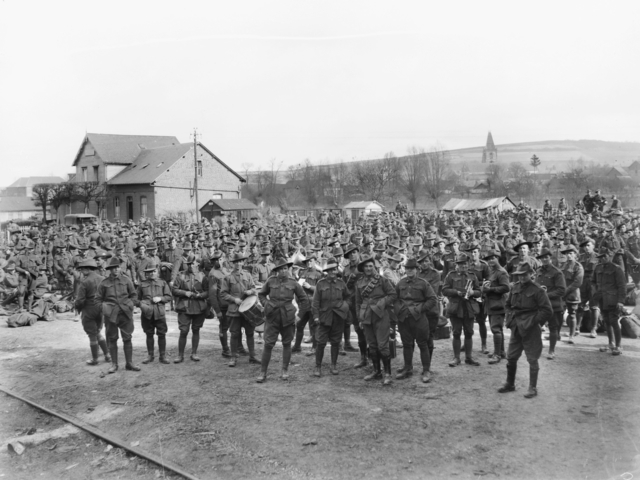
3rd Division soldiers waiting for a train at Gamaches railway station at the start of their journey back to Australia in April 1919

By the end of the war the AIF had gained a reputation as a well-trained and highly effective military force, enduring more than two years of costly fighting on the Western Front before playing a significant role in the final Allied victory in 1918, albeit as a smaller part of the wider British Empire war effort. Like the other Dominion divisions from Canada and New Zealand, the Australians were viewed as being among the best of the British forces in France, and were often used to spearhead operations. 64 Australians were awarded the Victoria Cross. This reputation came at a heavy cost, with the AIF sustaining approximately 210,000 casualties, of which 61,519 were killed or died of wounds. This represented a total casualty rate of 64.8 percent, which was among the highest of any belligerent for the war. About another 4,000 men were captured. The majority of casualties occurred among the infantry (which sustained a casualty rate of 79 percent); however, the artillery (58 percent) and light horse (32 percent) also incurred significant losses.

After the war, all AIF units went into camp and began the process of demobilisation. The AIF's involvement in the occupation of former German or Turkish territory was limited as Prime Minister William Hughes requested their early repatriation. The exceptions were No. 4 Squadron, AFC and the 3rd Australian Casualty Clearing Station, which participated in the occupation of the Rhineland. The 7th Light Horse Regiment was also sent to occupy the Gallipoli peninsula for six weeks, along with a New Zealand regiment. At the time of the armistice, there were 95,951 soldiers in France and a further 58,365 in England, 17,255 in the Middle East plus nurses in Salonika and India, all to be transported home. Around 120 Australians decided to delay their departure and instead joined the British Army, serving in Northern Russia during the Russian Civil War, although officially the Australian government refused to contribute forces to the campaign.

By May 1919, the last troops were out of France, and 70,000 were encamped on Salisbury Plain. The men returned home on a "first come, first go" basis, with the process overseen by Monash in Britain and Chauvel in Cairo. Many of the soldiers undertook government-funded training in civilian occupations while awaiting repatriation to Australia. Only 10,000 Australian soldiers remained in England by September. Monash, the senior Australian commander, was repatriated on 26 December 1919. The last transport organised to repatriate troops was H.T. Naldera, which departed London on 13 April 1920. The AIF officially ceased to exist on 1 April 1921, and on 1 July 1921 the military hospitals in Australia passed into civilian hands. As a volunteer force, all units were demobilised at the end of the war. Australia's part-time military force, the Citizens Force, was subsequently reorganised to replicate the AIF's divisional structure and the numerical designations of many of its units to perpetuate their identities and battle honours.

== Legacy ==
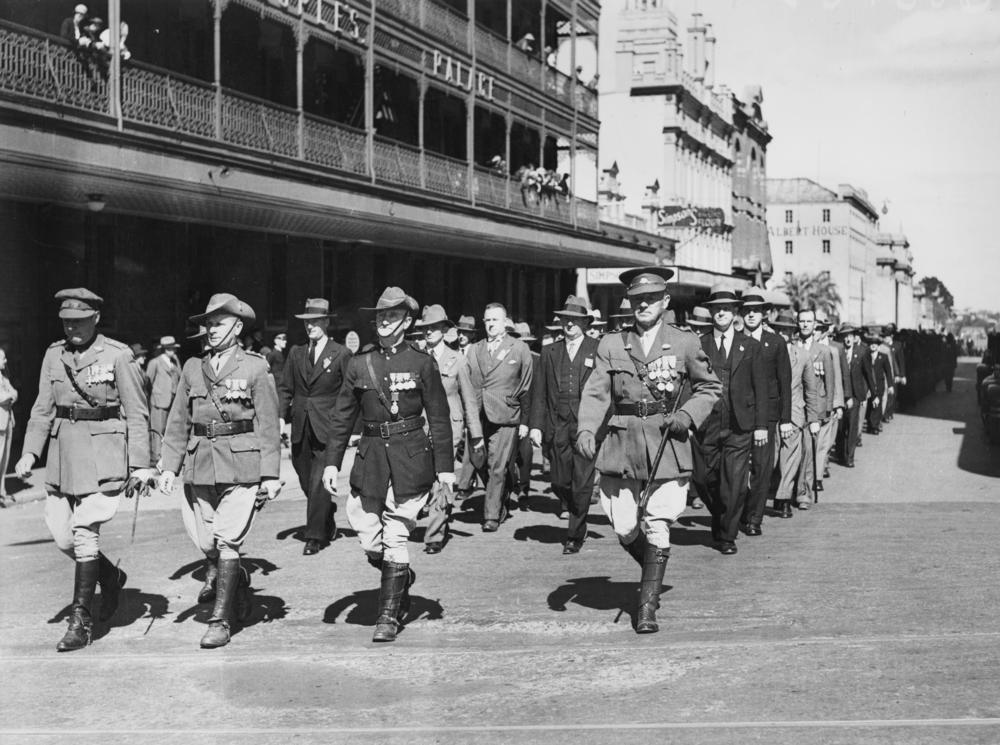
Returned servicemen marching in the 1937 Anzac Day commemorations in Brisbane

During and after the war, the AIF was often portrayed in glowing terms. As part of the "Anzac legend", the soldiers were depicted as good humoured and egalitarian men who had little time for the formalities of military life or strict discipline, yet fought fiercely and skilfully in battle. Australian soldiers was also seen as resourceful and self-reliant. The wartime official correspondent and post-war official historian C.E.W. Bean was central to the development of this stereotype. Bean believed that the character and achievements of the AIF reflected the unique nature of rural Australians, and frequently exaggerated the democratic nature of the force and the proportion of soldiers from rural areas in his journalism and the Official History of Australia in the War of 1914–1918. The perceived qualities of the AIF were seen as being unique, as the product of the harsh Australian environment, the ethos of the bush and egalitarianism. Such notions built on the concept of men from the bush being excellent natural soldiers which was prevalent in Australian culture before the war. The achievements of the AIF, especially during the Gallipoli campaign, were also frequently portrayed by Bean and others as having marked the birth of Australia as a nation. Moreover, the AIF's performance was often seen as proof that the character of Australians had passed the test of war.

The exploits of the AIF at Gallipoli, and then on the Western Front, subsequently became central to the national mythology. In the years that followed much was made of ethos of the AIF, including its volunteer status and the quality of "mateship". Yet many of the factors which had resulted in the AIF's success as a military formation were not exclusively Australian, with most modern armies recognising the importance of small-unit identity and group cohesion in maintaining morale. Many of the qualities that arguably defined the Australian soldier were also claimed by New Zealanders and Canadians as having been exhibited by their soldiers, whilst undoubtedly soldiers of the German, British and American armies also exhibited such traits, even if they were known by different terms. Objectively, the foundations of the AIF's performance were more likely to have been military professionalism based on "discipline, training, leadership, and sound doctrine". While the volunteer status of the AIF has been seen by some to explain its military performance, it was by no means unique in this regard. The status of their enlistment made little difference against the artillery, machine-gun fire, and wire obstacles of modern industrial warfare at any rate. Equally, individual skill and morale proved to be less important than sound tactics, with effective fire and movement ultimately making the difference in 1918. The Australians were not alone among the Allied armies in embracing such tactical innovations, while many of the new technologies and integrated weapon systems they relied upon were provided by the British Army.

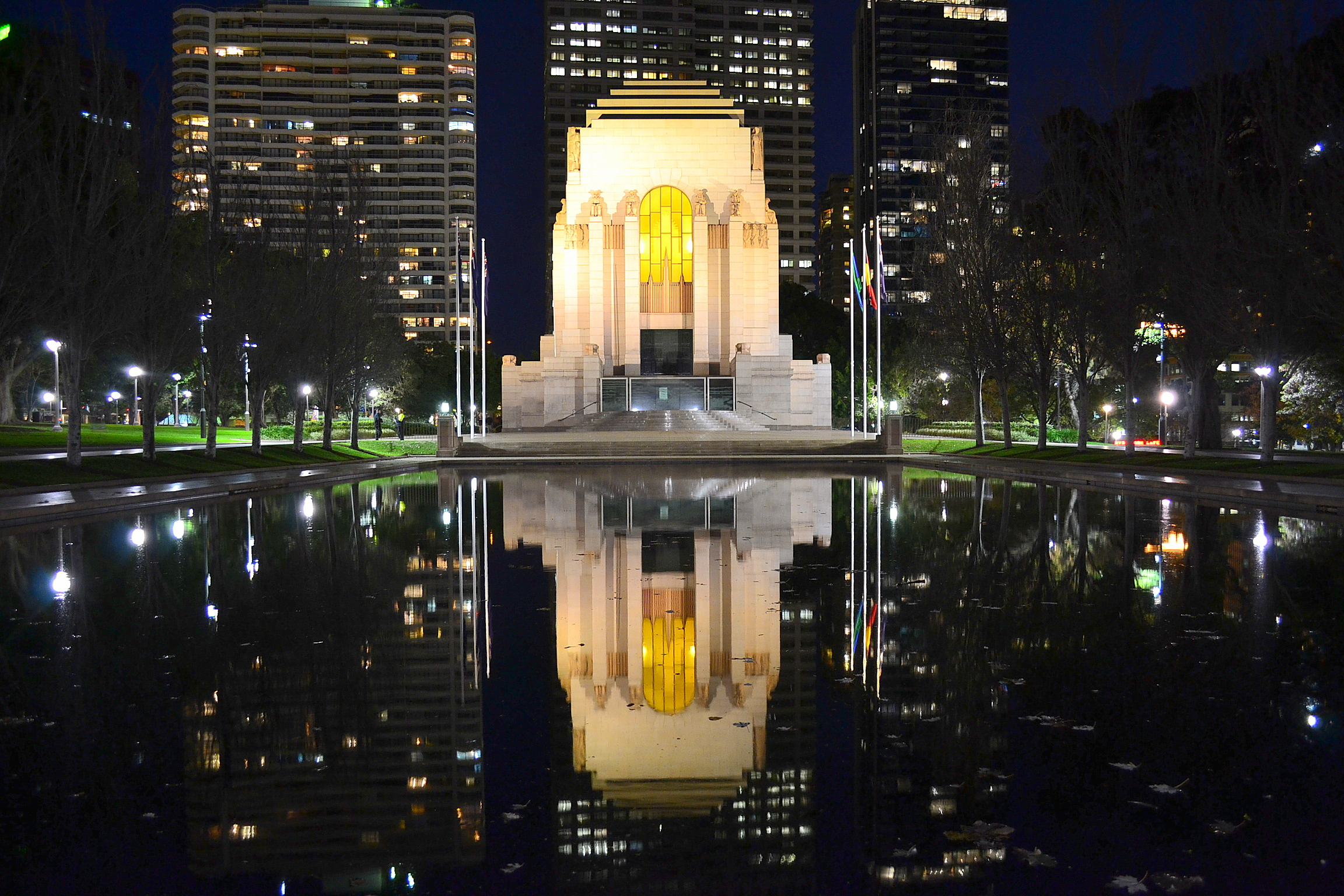
The ANZAC War Memorial in Sydney

Commemorating and celebrating the AIF became an entrenched tradition following World War I, with Anzac Day forming the centrepiece of remembrance of the war. The soldiers who served in the AIF, known colloquially as "Diggers", in time became "...one of the paramount Australian archetypes." When the Second Australian Imperial Force was raised in 1939 following the outbreak of World War II it was seen as inheriting the name and traditions of its predecessor. Perceptions of the AIF have evolved over time. During the 1950s and 1960s social critics began to associate the "Anzac legend" with complacency and conformism, and popular discontent concerning the Vietnam War and conscription from the mid-1960s led many people to reject it. Historians also increasingly questioned Bean's views concerning the AIF, leading to more realistic and nuanced assessments of the force. However, some historians continue to stress the AIF's achievements, and state that it was representative of Australia. The "Anzac legend" grew in popularity during the 1980s and 1990s when it was adopted as part of a new Australian nationalism, with the AIF often being portrayed as a uniquely Australian force that fought in other people's wars and was sacrificed by the British military in campaigns which were of little importance to Australia. This depiction is controversial, however, and has been rejected by some historians. The Oxford Companion to Australian Military History judges that while it is unclear how popular perceptions of Australia's military history will evolve, "it is clear that the Anzac legend will remain an important national myth for some time to come".

== See also ==
- Australian Imperial Forces cricket team
- List of Australian diarists of World War I
- List of Australian Army artillery units in World War I
- List of Australian Army engineer units in World War I
- List of Australian Army medical units in World War I
- First Australian Imperial Force dental units
- Australian Army battle honours of World War I
