= List of Australian Army medical units in World War I =

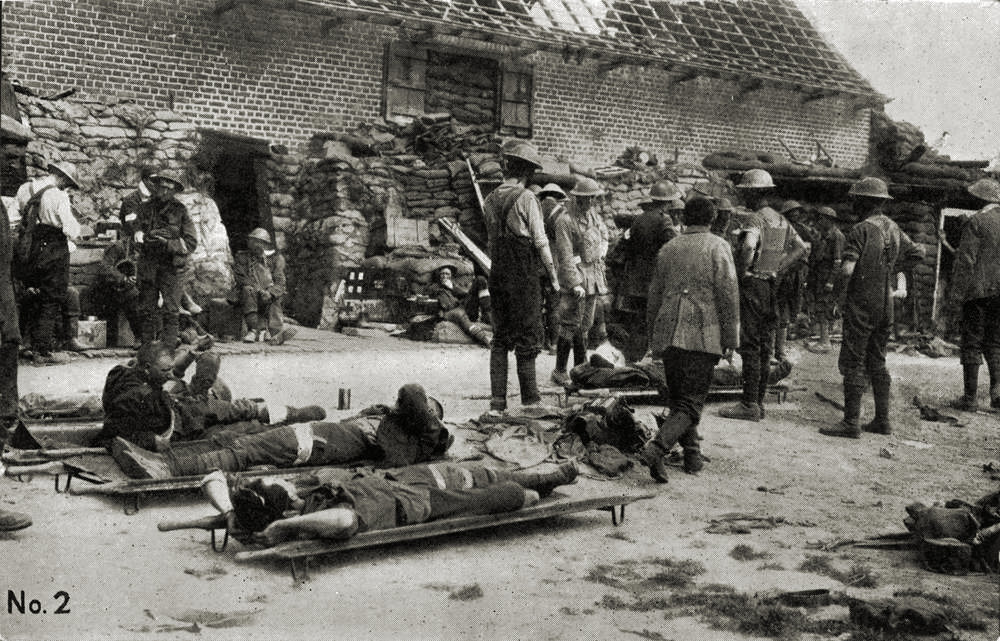
Australian Field Dressing Station during the Battle of Messines, 7 June 1917

The following is a list of Australian Army medical units in World War I.

== Field Ambulance ==
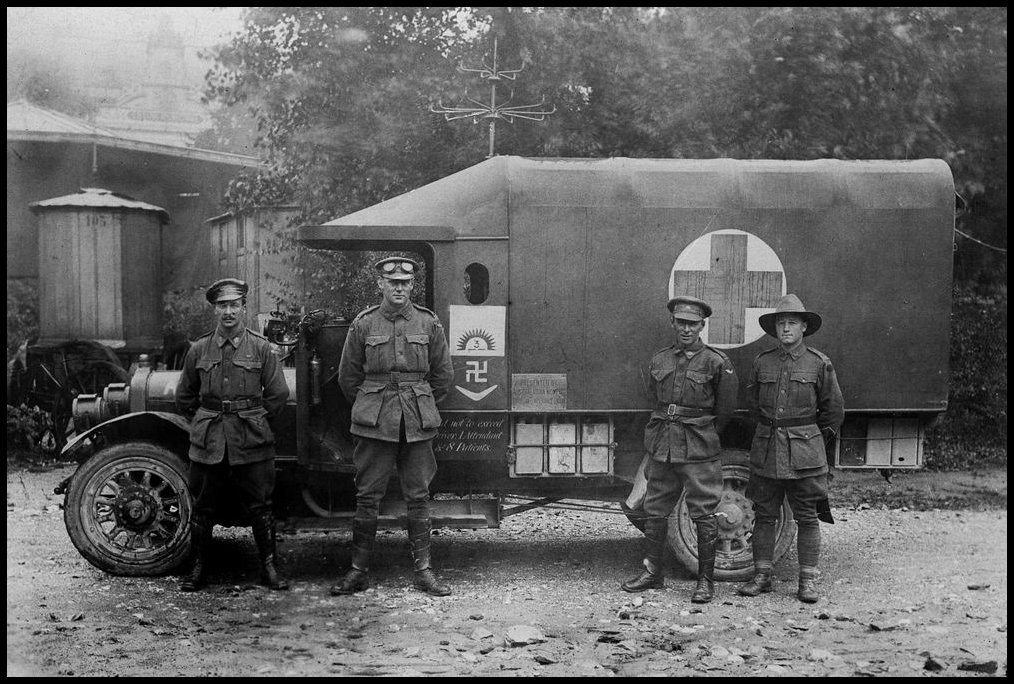
Australian Imperial Force field ambulance personnel, 1916

=== 1st Division ===
- 1st Australian Field Ambulance (New South Wales)
- 2nd Australian Field Ambulance (Victoria)
- 3rd Australian Field Ambulance

=== 2nd Division ===
- 5th Australian Field Ambulance (New South Wales)
- 6th Australian Field Ambulance (Victoria)
- 7th Australian Field Ambulance

=== 3rd Division ===
- 9th Australian Field Ambulance (New South Wales)
- 10th Australian Field Ambulance (Victoria)
- 11th Australian Field Ambulance (South Australia)

=== 4th Division ===
- 4th Australian Field Ambulance
- 12th Australian Field Ambulance
- 13th Australian Field Ambulance

=== 5th Division ===
- 8th Australian Field Ambulance (NSW)
- 14th Australian Field Ambulance
- 15th Australian Field Ambulance

=== 6th Division ===
(Only partially formed, and was disbanded prior to completion of assembly.)

- 16th Australian Field Ambulance
- 17th Australian Field Ambulance

== Light Horse Field Ambulance ==
=== ANZAC Mounted Division ===
- 1st Australian Light Horse Field Ambulance
- 2nd Australian Light Horse Field Ambulance
- 3rd Australian Light Horse Field Ambulance (to 1916)

=== Australian Mounted Division ===
- 3rd Australian Light Horse Field Ambulance (from 1917)
- 4th Australian Light Horse Field Ambulance
- 5th Australian Light Horse Field Ambulance

=== Camel Field Ambulance ===
- Camel Field Ambulance

== Casualty Clearing Station ==
- 1st Australian Casualty Clearing Station
- 2nd Australian Casualty Clearing Station
- 3rd Australian Casualty Clearing Station

== Stationary Hospital ==
- 1st Australian Stationary Hospital (South Australia)
- 2nd Australian Stationary Hospital (Western Australia)

== Infectious Diseases Hospital ==
- 1st Dermatological Hospital
- 2nd Infectious Diseases Hospital
- 3rd Infectious Diseases Hospital
- 4th Infectious Diseases Hospital (Queensland)
- 5th Infectious Diseases Hospital (Victoria)
- 6th Infectious Diseases Hospital (South Australia)

== Australian Flying Corps Hospital ==
- Australian Flying Corps Hospital

== Australian General Hospital ==
- 1st Australian General Hospital (Queensland) – Heliopolis, Egypt January 1915 to March 1916; Rouen, France to 1918; then Sutton Veny, England
- 2nd Australian General Hospital (New South Wales) was in Cairo in 1915.
- 3rd Australian General Hospital (New South Wales) - Mudros, Greece July 1915 to January 1916; Abbassia, Egypt to October 1916; Abbeville, France from May 1917 until end of war
- 4th Australian General Hospital (New South Wales)
- 5th Australian General Hospital (Victoria)
- 6th Australian General Hospital (Queensland)
- 7th Australian General Hospital (South Australia)
- 8th Australian General Hospital (Western Australia)
- 9th Australian General Hospital (Tasmania)
- 10th Australian General Hospital
- 11th Australian General Hospital (Victoria)
- 12th Australian General Hospital (Tasmania)
- 13th Australian General Hospital (Queensland)
- 14th Australian General Hospital
- 15th Australian General Hospital (South Australia)
- 16th Australian General Hospital (Victoria)
- 17th Australian General Hospital (Queensland)

== Australian Auxiliary Hospitals ==
- 1st Australian Auxiliary Hospital (1)
- 1st Australian Auxiliary Hospital (2)
- 2nd Australian Auxiliary Hospital (1)
- 2nd Australian Auxiliary Hospital (2)
- 3rd Australian Auxiliary Hospital (1)
- 3rd Australian Auxiliary Hospital (2)
- 4th Australian Auxiliary Hospital (1)
- 4th Australian Auxiliary Hospital (2)
- 5th Australian Auxiliary Hospital
- 6th Australian Auxiliary Hospital
- 7th Australian Auxiliary Hospital (Queensland)
- 8th Australian Auxiliary Hospital (Queensland)
- 9th Australian Auxiliary Hospital (Queensland)
- 10th Australian Auxiliary Hospital (Queensland)
- 11th Australian Auxiliary Hospital (1) (New South Wales)
- 11th Australian Auxiliary Hospital (2) (New South Wales)
- 12th Australian Auxiliary Hospital (New South Wales)
- 13th Australian Auxiliary Hospital (New South Wales)
- 14th Australian Auxiliary Hospital (New South Wales)
- 15th Australian Auxiliary Hospital (Victoria)
- 16th Australian Auxiliary Hospital (Victoria)
- 17th Australian Auxiliary Hospital (South Australia)
- 18th Australian Auxiliary Hospital (South Australia)
- 19th Australian Auxiliary Hospital (Western Australia)
- 20th Australian Auxiliary Hospital (Western Australia)
- 21st Australian Auxiliary Hospital (1) (Western Australia)
- 21st Australian Auxiliary Hospital (2) (New South Wales)
- 22nd Australian Auxiliary Hospital (Western Australia)
- 23rd Australian Auxiliary Hospital (Tasmania)
- 24th Australian Auxiliary Hospital (Western Australia)
- 25th Australian Auxiliary Hospital (Tasmania)
- 26th Australian Auxiliary Hospital (Western Australia)
- 27th Australian Auxiliary Hospital (Queensland)
- 28th Australian Auxiliary Hospital (New South Wales)

== Sanitary Sections ==
- 1st Australian Sanitary Company (Initially assigned to 1st Division)
- 1st Australian Sanitary Section (2nd Division)
- 2nd Australian Sanitary Section (1st Division)
- 3rd Australian Sanitary Section (Queensland) (3rd Division)
- 4th Australian Sanitary Section (4th Division)
- 5th Australian Sanitary Section (5th Division)
- 6th Australian Sanitary Section – Tell El Kebir Australian Imperial Force Training Base at the Suez Canal in Egypt, later moved to England with the Australian Imperial Force Training Centre
- 7th Australian Sanitary Section (Anzac Mounted Division)
- 8th Australian Sanitary Section (Australian Mounted Division)
- 9th Australian Sanitary Section (6th Division)

== Special Medical Units ==
- Anzac Field Laboratory
- Base Depot of Medical Stores

== Convalescent and Command Depots ==
=== Convalescent Depot ===
- 1st Australian Convalescent Depot (1)
- 1st Australian Convalescent Depot (2)
- 2nd Australian Convalescent Depot
- 3rd Australian Convalescent Depot
- 4th Australian Convalescent Depot
- 5th Australian Convalescent Depot
- 6th Australian Convalescent Depot (Victoria)
- 7th Australian Convalescent Depot (Victoria)
- 8th Australian Convalescent Depot (Victoria)

=== Command Depot ===
- 1st Australian Command Depot
- 2nd Australian Command Depot
- 3rd Australian Command Depot
- 4th Australian Command Depot

== Hospital Ships ==
- 1st Hospital Ship A63 HMAHS Karoola
- 2nd Hospital Ship A61 HMAHS Kanowna
- Hospital Ship A55 HMAT Kyarra – later converted to a troop transport

=== Temporary Hospital Ships ===
- RMS Aquitania
- SS Grantala
- SS Ryarra

== See also ==
- Military history of Australia during World War I
- First Australian Imperial Force dental units
