= Anzac Square =

Anzac Square may refer to:

- ANZAC Square, Brisbane, Australia, a town square and memorial
  - Anzac Square Building
  - ANZAC Square Arcade
  - Anzac Square mosaic mural
- Anzac Square, in Campsie, New South Wales
- Anzac Square, Dunedin, New Zealand
- Anzac Square, a park in Parkside, New Zealand
- Anzac Square, a football venue in Timaru, New Zealand
