= ANZAC A badge =

Brass insignia of Australian Imperial force

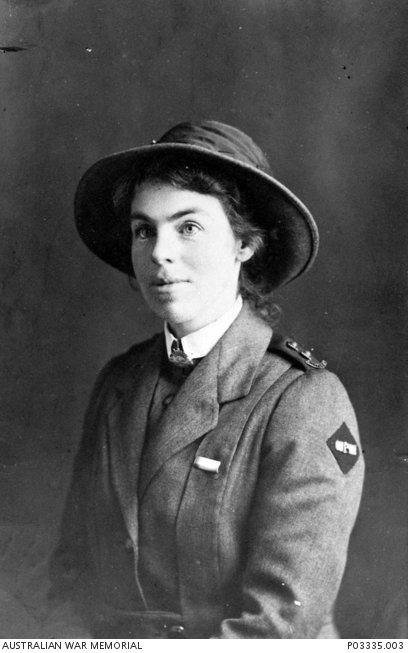
Sister Muriel Burbury of the Australian Army Nursing Service wearing the ANZAC A Badge on her left shoulder colour patch for the 3rd Australian General Hospital. She served on Lemnos Island during the Gallipoli Campaign.

The ANZAC "A" badge is a brass insignia authorised in November 1917 for members of the First Australian Imperial Force who had served as a member of the Australian and New Zealand Army Corps (ANZACs) during the Gallipoli campaign in 1915. In 1918, eligibility was extended to those who had served at Lemnos, Imbros and Tenedos and the transports and hospitals off Gallipoli as well as the communications line to Egypt.

== History ==
The origins of the award are uncertain with John Monash, William Birdwood and John Gellibrand all being credited with the idea in various accounts. The most likely version is that the award was a result of several ideas proposed in early 1916 to commemorate the Anzacs. When Monash led his brigade in commemorating the first Anzac Day, men who had served at Gallipoli wore a blue ribbon on their right breast and those who had gone ashore as part of the first landing wore a red ribbon as well. Birdwood advised in August 1916 that he supported Australian veterans of the ANZAC campaign wearing an "A" badge on their colour patches.

The 1st and 2nd Divisions supported the idea enthusiastically. The 3rd and 4th, both of which had fewer ANZAC veterans in their ranks, were less enthusiastic in their adoption of the badge. However, Monash, as commander of the 3rd Division, was able to claim by November 1916 that "'All who have a right to be called "Anzacs" among us are now wearing a metal "A" on the colour patches on the sleeves".

In early 1917, convalescent soldiers returned to Australia wearing the badge and its status was initially questioned. This led to its formal approval through AIF Order 937 issued in November 1917. Subsequent orders clarified the entitlement to the badge and made it compulsory. In January 1918, the order extended eligibility to people who had served behind the lines on the Greek islands of Lemnos, Imbros and Tenedos, on the communication lines and hospital ships offshore or on the islands or in the communications to Egypt. This included nurses who served in the hospital ships meaning that women as well as men received acknowledgement as ANZACS.

There was initial resentment of the badges by soldiers who had fought in France at the Battle of Pozières and the Battle of Mouquet Farm in 1916 who thought that their contribution had been equal to the Anzacs.

ANZAC rosettes were also worn by men who had joined in 1914 and came home on ANZAC leave to show that they had not been shirking their duty.
