= Anzac Parade =

Anzac Parade can refer to:

- Anzac Parade, Canberra
- Anzac Parade, Sydney
- Anzac Day parades for war veterans held on Anzac Day.
