= First Australian Imperial Force dental units =

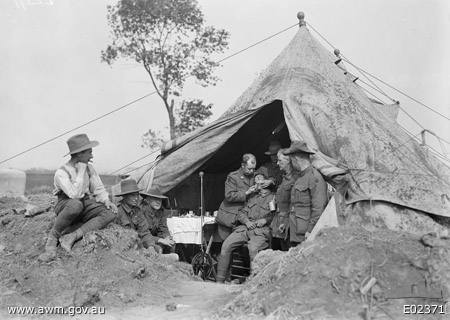
A dental officer of the 34th Australian Dental Unit working at an advanced post in France in June 1918

The First Australian Imperial Force (AIF) was one of the first military forces to care for soldiers' teeth, and raised a large number of specialist dental units during World War I.

== History ==
As originally formed, the AIF did not include any dentists, with dental care of soldiers being made part of the duties of the force's medical officers. Dentists and dental mechanics who enlisted in the AIF also provided dental care on an unofficial basis.

The AIF's experiences in the Gallipoli Campaign showed the need for proper dental care of soldiers. Accordingly, 36 dental units were raised between January and April 1916 from qualified personnel already serving within the AIF. Each unit comprised a dentist, two dental mechanics and an orderly. These men were all members of the Australian Dental Corps.

By the end of the war, 118 dental units had been formed and many of the AIF's formation headquarters had highly ranked dental staff officers. The dental units were usually attached to base camps or specialist medical units and hospitals. The AIF was the only Allied force of World War I to form specialised dental units, with dental teams in the other national armies being integrated into general-purpose medical units.
