= 1st Australian Wireless Signal Squadron =

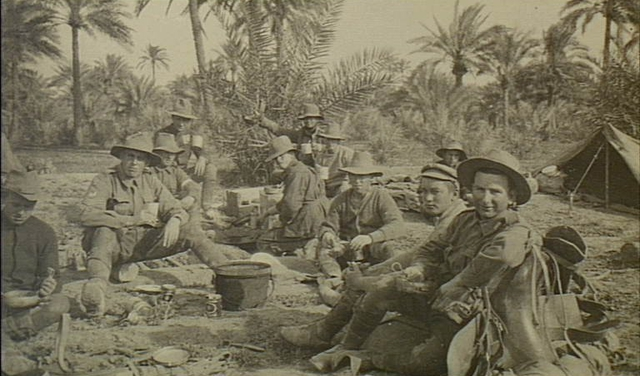
- 'F' Station, 1st Wireless Signal Squadron in Baghdad, 1917.
- Active: 1915–1919
- Country: Australia; New Zealand
- Branch: Australian Army; New Zealand Army
- Type: Signals
- Engagements: World War I: Mesopotamian Campaign

The 1st Australian Wireless Signal Squadron was a unit of the Australian Imperial Force (AIF) which served in Mesopotamia (modern-day Iraq) during World War I. Formed in late 1915, it took part in the Mesopotamian Campaign from 1916 to 1918, providing communications to British forces. Later, elements of the squadron served as part of Dunsterforce in 1918 and 1919, and in Kurdistan in 1919. The unit was also known as the 1st Wireless Signal Squadron and 1st Australian and New Zealand Signal Squadron.

== History ==
=== Formation ===
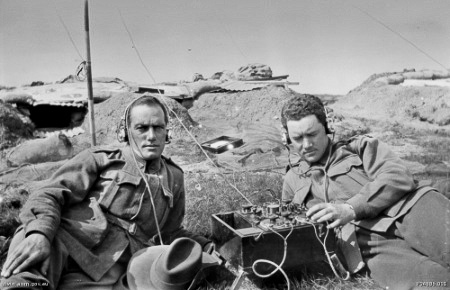
A pair of Australian signallers, each wearing a headphone set, listen in on an early Marconi Mk III crystal shortwave tuner set. The men are probably conducting a training exercise at the signalling school at Broadmeadows, Victoria

At the outbreak of World War I, the British Indian Army had a severe shortage of wireless equipment and trained operators. On 27 December 1915, the Australian government received a request for a troop of wireless signallers (approximately 50 soldiers) to be sent to Mesopotamia. The operators were raised from the Marconi School of Wireless in Sydney and the Broadmeadows depot in Victoria, while the drivers, who made up half of the unit, were raised from the Army Service Corps at Moore Park in Sydney. The troop, which became known as the 1st Australian Pack Wireless Signal Troop, sailed from Melbourne on 5 February 1916 and after stops at Bombay and Columbo, arrived in Basra on 19 March 1916. An equivalent unit was sent by the government of New Zealand, and it was combined with the Australians to form "C" Troop of the 1st Wireless Squadron.

=== Mesopotamian Campaign ===
On 25 April 1916, the first of the Australian wireless stations set off from Basra on a 140 miles (230 km) march north with the British 15th Indian Division. A month later the second station was sent by boat across Lake Hammar to Nasiriyah. (Note: The boat was piloted by Gertrude Bell, a British archaeologist who mapped and identified Mesopotamian ruins. She was appointed Commander of the Order of the British Empire in 1917. She later helped create the modern state of Iraq.) Two New Zealand stations were sent to important locations on the Tigris.

In March 1916, the Indian government requested that a third troop and headquarters unit be sent to reinforce these two Anzac troops to form a squadron. This squadron became known as the 1st (ANZAC) Wireless Signal Squadron and consisted of two Australian troops and one New Zealand troop. Each troop consisted of four stations. About half of these stations were more powerful transmitters carried on six-horse limbered wagons, while the other half remained pack stations. Two of the Australian stations were charged with intercepting all enemy wireless communications, while a cipher expert, Captain Clauson of the Somerset Light Infantry decoded the messages and passed them onto Intelligence Branch.

==== Maude's offensive ====
In October 1916, the squadron was moved to the front in preparation for the British advance. Stations "A" through to "H" were Australian, while Stations "I" to "L" were New Zealand. The mobile Anzac stations allowed the commander of the British forces, General Frederick Stanley Maude, direct control over columns of cavalry out on operations. The column commanders were required to report via the wireless stations, to Maude every hour. The stations achieved reliable communications by using a series of relays, in which the rear most station would dismantle the moment the foremost station began to transmit. Although the rear station usually had a cavalry escort while it caught up with the main column, sometimes it had to depend on itself for protection. Stations "A" and "F" were on interception duties, while stations "B" and "E" were at the headquarters of the two British corps.

The British offensive began on the night of 13 December with a short thrust across the desert to the Shatt al-Hayy, a channel connecting the Tigris and Euphrates Rivers. The cavalry reached the channel by dawn and began advancing towards the Tigris. During this advance 'G' station came under fire from a Turkish monitor on the river and it and the cavalry were forced to withdraw back to the channel.

Between January and February, a series of infantry attacks cleared the Turks from the right bank of the Tigris river. During this period, the wireless stations supported the cavalry, who conducted raids, screened artillery movements and tried to outflank the Suwaikiya marshes, a wide flanking maneuver which failed due to torrential rains.

Kut fell on 23 February 1917 and the cavalry was ordered to cross the Tigris and cut off the retreating Turks. The Turkish rear-guard managed to check the pursuit of the cavalry, who were now too tired to cut off the Turks. However, British gunboats on the Tigris caught up with the retreat on the 26th and forced the Turks to abandon many gunboats, barges, land transport, ammunition and money. The cavalry entered Aziziyeh, 100 kilometres (62 mi) north of Kut on 29 February, where it was forced to break off the pursuit for a week while it waited for supplies.

==== Fall of Baghdad ====
On 5 March 1917, Maude moved on Baghdad, but was checked on the Diyala River. Maude shifted a column to try to turn the Turkish left. The commander of the Turkish forces, Khalil Pasha, shifted his forces away from Diyala to mirror this move, allowing the 13th Division to cross the Diyala river on 10 March. Following his defeat, Khalil Pasha abandoned Baghdad the next day, destroying the German wireless station. The Anzac signallers were amongst the first Allied troops to enter the city and were able to establish communications with Basra. In the afternoon of the 11th they were able to relay the King's congratulations on Maude's success.

=== Disbandment ===
The last members of the unit returned to Australia on 20 December 1919. In total, 558 Australian signallers were sent to Mesopotamia, however only a small fraction of that number were ever in country at one time. Although the squadron did not suffer any deaths from enemy fire, disease was responsible for the deaths of 20 soldiers from the wireless squadrons.

== See also ==
- Mesopotamian Half Flight – a small unit of the Australian Flying Corps (AFC) which also served in Mesopotamia
- Royal Australian Corps of Signals

== Notes ==
Footnotes

Citations
