= Anzac Day Act (Australia) =

Australian Act

The Anzac Day Act 1995 in Australia is a Federal Commonwealth Act, to declare Anzac Day on 25 April to be a national day of commemoration to "recognise and commemorate the contribution of all those who have served Australia (including those who died) in time of war and in war‑like conflicts" to be observed on 25 April every year.

The Act was first introduced into the Australian Parliament as the Anzac Day Bill 1994 by Labor MP Con Sciacca, as the Minister for the Veterans' Affairs, was announced in a sitting of the House of Representatives on 7 December 1994, and gained Royal Assent on 29 March 1995.

== State Legislation ==
As a Commonwealth Act, the act does not declare Anzac day to be a public holiday, this is done through state legislation of the same, or similar names for many states, or in some cases through a separate act on holidays. It is customary for Anzac day that businesses and entertainment that are not open to commemorate Anzac day, open at 1pm. The state Anzac acts also usually legislate a Anzac day fund, or trust for the collection of monies from large or professionally organised Anzac day events are to pay, and where other monies raised are to be held and distributed to ex-service organisations.

=== State Legislation ===
The following is a list of the state legislation or acts that declare Anzac day to be a holiday, establish an Anzac Day fund, and/or declare reduced trading hours.

==== New South Wales ====
New South Wales does not have a separate Anzac Day Act, instead the governance of trading is set out by the Retail Trading Act 2008. The trading restrictions prevent businesses from opening before 1pm, some businesses are exempt from morning trading restrictions.

==== Queensland ====
The Anzac Day Act 1995, declares Anzac Day as a holiday throughout Queensland on 25 April of each year. The act legislates a fund called the Anzac Day Trust Fund which administers payments from the fund for a number of reasons through application, including to aged ex-service personnel (veterans) for home improvement, to families of deceased veterans for their welfare, and organisations that serve the veteran community, or whose members are made up of veterans. The act does not itself restrict trade on Anzac day, however the Act makes specific mention of the restriction of trade within 'The Trading (Allowable Hours) Act 1990', dividing retailers into two distinct categories, exempt shops, and independent shops, where independent shops must remain closed until 1pm, while exempt shops can remain open all day, however may and often do observe 1pm opening times on Anzac day.

==== Victoria ====
The ANZAC Day Act 1958 is the state legislation that governs activities and observance of ANZAC day in the state of Victoria. The Act restricts places of businesses and entertainment, from opening or operating until 1pm; this includes specifically, cinemas showing films, the playing of sports matches, or the auction of land or property. The restriction of businesses being open or providing entertainment before 1pm is for licensed venues commemorating ANZAC Day, that may provide alcohol or food service. The act also restricts factories and warehouses from being open for entire day, and also states that all employees of such a business are to be given a whole holiday. The observance of ANZAC day as a public holiday is set forth in the Public Holidays Act 1993.

==== Australian Capital Territory ====
The ACT has no specific Anzac Day act, with the public holiday declared within the Holidays Act 1958 (ACT). Furthermore the ACT has deregulated trading hours for all non alcohol licensed premises, and as such there is no legal basis for business to remain closed until 1pm, and business are allowed to be open all day, however this is still generally observed by most retailers.

==== Tasmania ====
The Anzac Day Observance Act 1929 is the act that declares the observance of Anzac day as a national holiday, and restricts: the opening of certain shops, the play of sports or races, or the bookkeeping of races prior to 12:30pm.

==== South Australia ====
The ANZAC Day Commemoration Act 2005 legislates a ANZAC Day Commemoration Fund and the purposes for dispensing of monies from the fund, further the act and restricts the play of sports prior to 12 noon without prior authorisation from the minister with input from the RSL.

==== Western Australia ====
The act also legislates The Anzac Day Trust, that receives monies from professional sporting events or large race meets, equal to 5% of the ticket price multiplied by the number of attendees. Payments from the fund are distributed through the Anzac Day Trust Grants Program for the purpose of providing funding to ex-service organisations in order to support the welfare of ex-service personnel and their families.

==== Northern Territory ====
Like the ACT, the Northern Territory has deregulated trading hours, and as such retailers may be open all day, however generally they observe a 1pm opening time; some places of businesses may operate between 4:30am and 10am on top of their normal trading areas, provided some conditions are met.
