= Don Ross (artist) =

Queensland artist noted for his jewellery work and a mosaic mural

- Born: 15 January 1917
- Died: 16 January 2015 (aged 98)
- Education: University of Queensland
- Occupations: Dentist and artist
- Notable work: Mosaic mural, Shrine of Remembrance, Anzac Square, Brisbane.

Donald Mackenzie Ross (1917–2015) was an Australian artist and former dentist, based in Brisbane, Queensland, known for his iconic jewellery and the mosaic mural in the crypt beneath the Shrine of Remembrance, Anzac Square, Brisbane. He was a key figure in the Brisbane artistic and craft scene for the entire second half of the 20th century, working across several different media – prints, etchings, woodcuts, pen and ink, oils, silver, gold, enamel, bronze and mosaics.

== Personal life ==
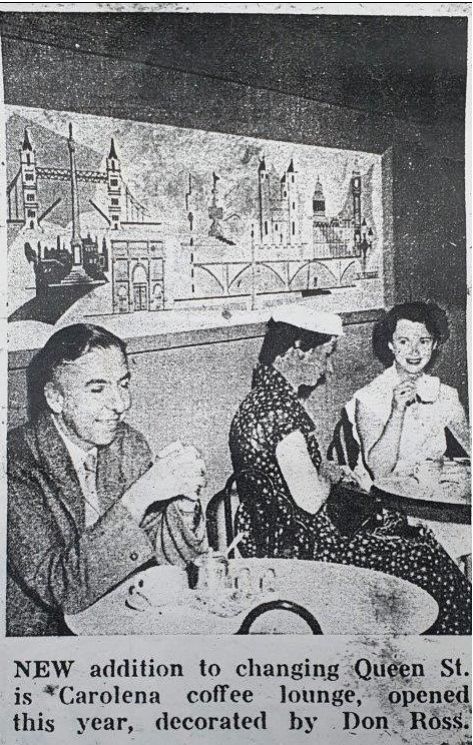
Artist Don Ross in the Carolena coffee lounge, Queen Street Brisbane, in its opening year, 1954

Ross was born in Brisbane, 15 January 1917, son of William Donald Ross, dentist, and Eileen Whelan. He married Joy Dickson in 1942, and had one son, Darryl Ross.

Ross attended the Eagle Junction State School, Brisbane Grammar and Nudgee College schools in Brisbane before enrolling in dentistry at the University of Queensland. After graduating in 1939, Ross joined his father's dental practice, W.D. Ross & Sons, above the Tattersalls Club, Edward Street, Brisbane, where he worked until he was in his early 50s.

He died in Brisbane on 16 January 2015, aged 98.

== Artistic career ==
Ross studied privately with Richard Rodier Rivron in the late 1940s, then attended life classes with Jon Molvig, Ian Reece and Roy Churcher. Mainly self-taught, using Max Meldrum's philosophy of tonal painting to execute portraits during the 1950s, Don Ross was soon Influenced by the work of English artists Ivon Hitchens and Victor Pasmore. By 1962 much of his work was visually abstract, with the point of departure being "back in history or into space" where "anything new is still part of the old – Persian, Indian, Mexican, Peruvian and even the cave paintings which are as new as tomorrow". This abiding interest in ancient civilizations, their languages, rituals and customs continued to be the dominant influence on his work.

From the mid-1960s Ross focused entirely on making jewellery, having embarked on this art form in 1963 when his son, Darryl, asked for help to make a friendship ring. Ross showed his son how he could cast this ring using the 'lost wax' process. Entirely self taught, the skills he learned and used in his dental practice were the basis for his intricate work in gold, sterling silver and copper. Having already won various awards for his work, he retired from dentistry in 1969 to devote himself entirely to his practice. His jewellery is said to reflect 'a deliberate reference to historic styles and ancient symbolism, often earmarked by a gregarious theatrical whimsy, making use of enamels, casting and a variety of exotic dental alloys and porcelains'.

Ross was a founding member and exhibiting artist of the Queensland branch of the renowned Contemporary Art Society (Australia), (C.A.S.) which had been established as a focus for innovatory art practice. Ross held the position of Vice President between the years 1961–1963. Together with Merv Muhling, he was also a founding member of the Queensland Jewellery Workshop (QJW), a sub group of the Crafts Association Queensland (later Craft Queensland, now, Artisan), considered to be the most exclusive 'club' for jewellers and metalsmiths in any state in Australia. The intention of the QJW was to support the emerging field of contemporary jewellery by creating educational and exhibiting opportunities. It was the first collective of its kind in Australia, at a time when there were no formal opportunities for study of this art form in Queensland. In 1980, the QJW became affiliated with other emerging interstate collectives, adopting the name of Jewellers and Metalsmiths Group of Australia (JMGA). The Queensland chapter of the Jewellers and Metalsmiths Group of Australia is now known as JMGQ.

Ross gave many workshops around Queensland and was the Queensland Jewellery Workshop representative on the Editorial Advisory Panel of Craft Australia magazine. He also served on the advisory board of the Queensland Crafts Council.

== Awards ==
1964: 'Modern Style' (Industrial section), Royal National Show Fine Arts Exhibition, Brisbane, Queensland

1964: Sir David Lloyd Jones Prize

1965 Redcliffe Contemporary Art Prize, Queensland

1965: Caltex Contemporary Art Prize, Dalby, Queensland

1982 Westpac City of Brisbane Crafts Award

== Commissions ==
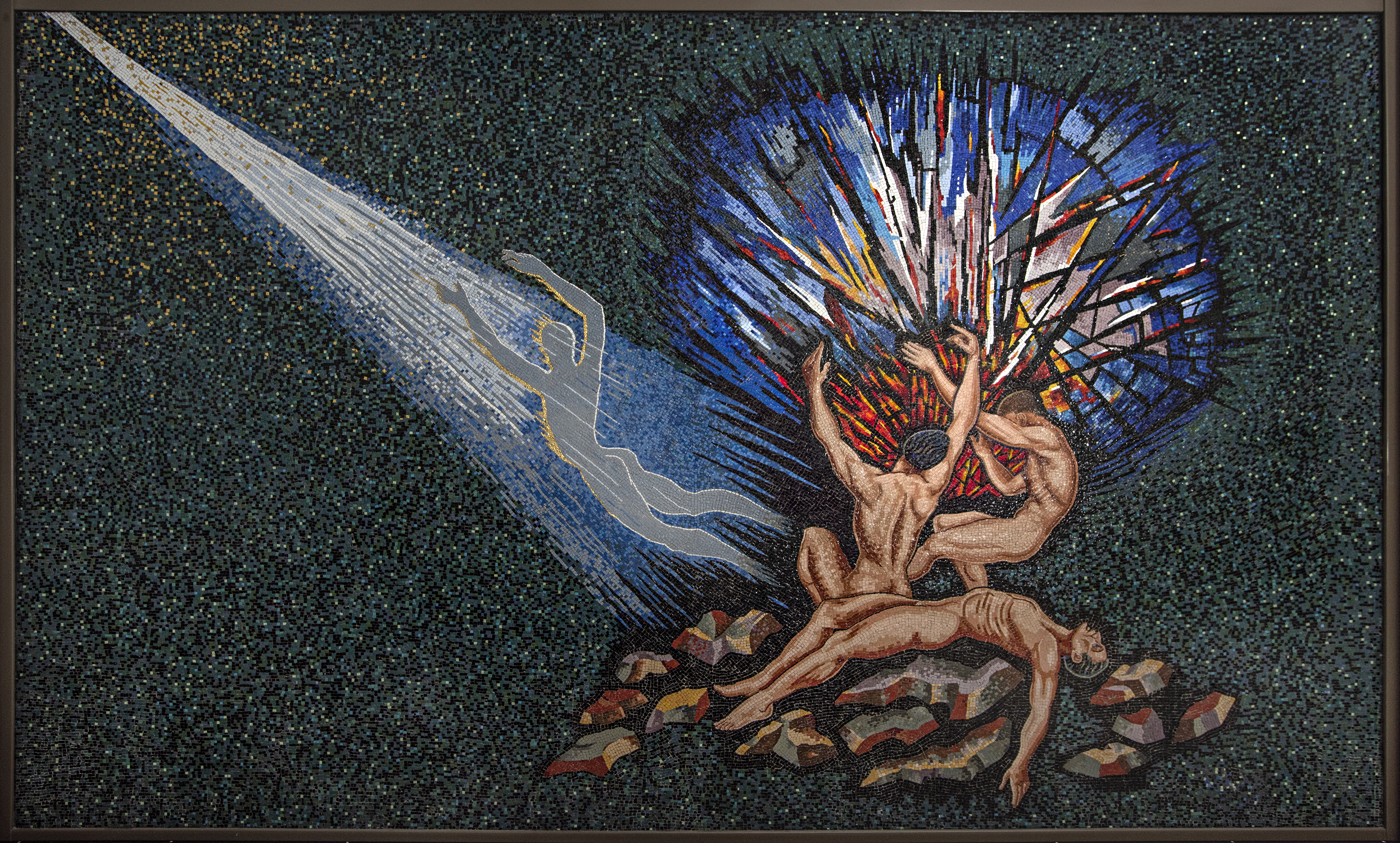
Mosaic mural by Don Ross, Anzac Square, Brisbane

1959: Mosaic mural, 'Shrine of Memories', Anzac House, Brisbane, Queensland

bronze sculpture figure commission, AMP Society, Brisbane, Queensland

== Exhibitions ==
1954: Queensland Artists of Fame and Promise, 3rd Annual Exhibition (Arts Council of Australia, Queensland Division), Finney Isles Auditorium, Brisbane, October 1954

1956: Queensland Artists of Fame and Promise, 4th Annual Exhibition (Arts Council of Australia, Queensland Division), Centaur House, Queen Street Brisbane, October 1956

1956: H.C. Richards Memorial Prize for Painting Exhibition, Queensland Art Gallery, Gregory Terrace, October 1956

1957: Queensland Artists of Fame and Promise, 5th Annual Exhibition (Arts Council of Australia, Queensland Division)

1957: Clontarf Beach [Redcliffe) Art Contest 1957, Ace of Clubs Hall, Redcliffe, March 1957

1957: H.C. Richards Memorial Prize for Painting Exhibition, Queensland Art Gallery, Gregory Terrace, Brisbane, October 1957

1958: H.C. Richards Memorial Prize Exhibition, Queensland Art Gallery, Gregory Terrace, Brisbane

1962: C.A.S.1 [Contemporary Art Society (Queensland branch)] first Autumn exhibition, Hardy Brothers Gallery, Queen Street, Brisbane, April 1962

1962: C.A.S.2 [Contemporary Art Society (Queensland branch)] First National Exhibition, Finney Isles Auditorium, Brisbane, October 1962

1963: L. J. Harvey Memorial Prize for Drawing Exhibition, Queensland Art Gallery, Brisbane, September 1963

1964: L. J. Harvey Memorial Prize for Drawing Exhibition, Queensland Art Gallery, Brisbane, October 1964

1964: Redcliffe Art Contest 8th Annual Exhibition, Ace of Clubs Hall, Redcliffe, August 1964

1964: Royal National Show Fine Arts Exhibition, Brisbane

1964: C.A.S.5 [Contemporary Art Society (Queensland branch)] Annual Autumn Exhibition, Finney Isles Auditorium, Brisbane, May 1964

1964: C.A.S.6 [Contemporary Art Society (Queensland branch)] Annual Interstate Exhibition, Finney Isles Auditorium, Brisbane, September 1964

1965: Warana-Caltex Oil & Watercolour Contest, Botanic Gardens, Edward Street, Brisbane, September 1965

1965: C.A.S.8 [Contemporary Art Society (Queensland branch)] Annual Interstate Exhibition, Finney Isles Auditorium, Brisbane, October 1965

1965: H.C. Richards Memorial Prize for Painting Exhibition, Queensland Art Gallery, Brisbane, October 1965.

1965: Redcliffe Art Contest 9th Annual Exhibition, Ace of Clubs Hall, Redcliffe, August 1965.

1966: Design Arts Centre (with Roy Churcher and Mervyn Moriarty)

1969: Gold Coast City Art Prize Exhibition, Chevron Paradise Hotel, Surfers Paradise, January 1969

1970: Crafts Association (Queensland Branch), inaugural exhibition, Design Arts Centre, Brisbane.

1973–1977 Design Centre, Craft Gallery, Brisbane

1974 Bonython Art Gallery, Sydney (solo exhibition)

1976: Fantasia Galleries, Canberra

1977: De Gruchy Gallery, Brisbane

1977: Australian Craftsmen, City Hall Gallery, Brisbane

1977: Craftsman's Market, Toowong, Brisbane (solo exhibition)

1980 Annual exhibition of the Queensland Jewellery Workshop, Victor Mace Gallery, Cintra Street Bowen Hills, Brisbane, November 1980

1980: Victorian Anniversary Craft Exhibition, Meat Market, Melbourne

1980: 'Objects to Human Scale: An exhibition of Contemporary Australian Jewellery'. Jewellers and Metalsmiths Group of Australia, Mittagong, New South Wales, (1980), touring in the same year to Japan, Hong Kong, Manila, and Seoul, and in April 1981 to the Queensland Art Gallery.

1982: A survey of Contemporary Australian Crafts, Queensland Art Gallery, Brisbane, 19 September 1982 – January 1983.

1984: Three crafts, organised by the Queensland Art Gallery, touring regional Queensland, 15 September 1984 – 20 December 1985.

1985: Annual exhibition of the Queensland Jewellery Workshop, Cintra House Galleries, Bowen Hills.

1991: Paintings and sculpture by members of the Contemporary Arts Society (Queensland Branch) 1961–1973. Brisbane City Hall Art Gallery, November 1991

1995: A Time Remembered: Art in Brisbane from 1950 to 1975, Queensland Art Gallery, 18 November 1995 – 28 January 1996.

2003: Tribute exhibition to Don Ross, Gallery 159, Ashgrove, Brisbane

== Represented ==
Don Ross's work is represented in private collections in England, South Africa, Denmark, United States and Australia, as well as in the Queensland Art Gallery and Gallery of Modern Art (QAGOMA).
