= Anzac Square mosaic mural =

Mural at Shrine of Remembrance, Brisbane, Australia

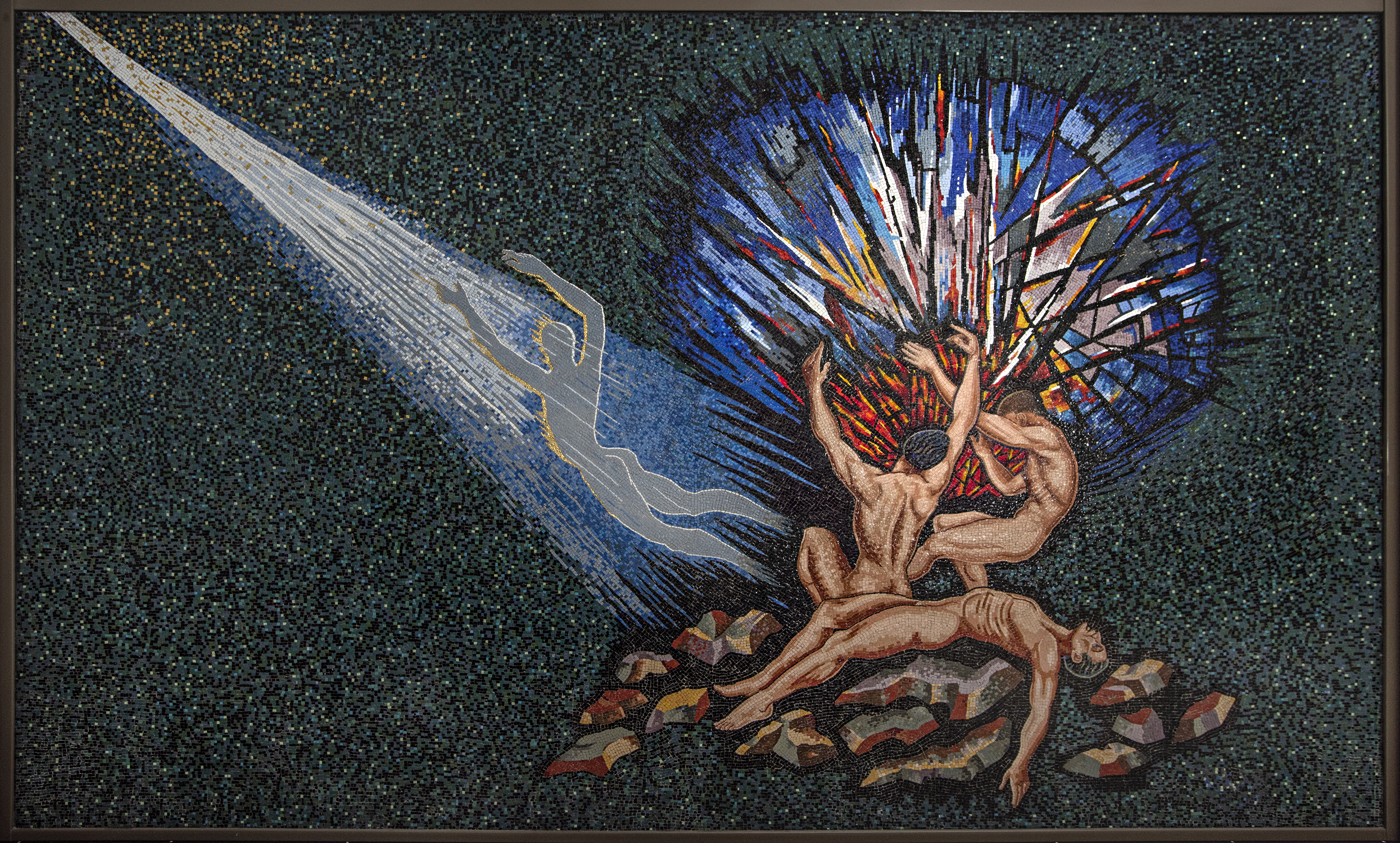
Mosaic mural by Don Ross, Anzac Square, Brisbane (2019)

The Anzac Square mosaic mural is a glass mosaic mural beneath the Shrine of Remembrance, Anzac Square, Brisbane, Queensland, Australia. It was designed and executed by Brisbane artist and dentist, Don Ross (1917–2015), in 1959, and is the centrepiece of the World War II Memorial Galleries.

Ross's mosaic is an abstract allusion to death and redemption, depicting three naked figures and a soul-like fourth ascending towards a stylised vision of heaven from a rocky outcrop. One figure lies prostrate on the rocks, the others are being drawn towards a burst of light. The form of this mural is considered to reflect the penetration of modern principles of design into traditional forms of commemoration.

The mosaic measures 8 by 2.5 metres (26.2 ft × 8.2 ft), and is made of 140,000 hand-cut 'fractured-face' Venetian glass tiles, known as tessere, chosen for their light-reflecting qualities.

The only larger mosaic in Queensland is the abstract glass mosaic on the western wall of the extension of the old State Library building in William Street, measuring 20.7 by 4.4 metres (222.8 ft × 47.3 ft), designed by artist Lindsay Edward (1919–2007) in 1958.

Ross's mosaic was commissioned by the Queensland Patriotic Fund in 1959 to commemorate those Queenslanders who served in the Second World War, abroad and on the home front. It was conceived as the central motif for the former World War II Shrine of Memories in the RSL State Branch Headquarters at Anzac House, 193 Wickham Terrace, Brisbane – its original location.

Ross worked on the mosaic by night, working by day as a dentist at his father's practice, W.D Ross & Sons. It took 4 years from conception to completion, and was unveiled in May 1962 at Anzac House by the Governor of Queensland, Sir Henry Able Smith.

In 1984, the World War II Shrine of Memories, including the Ross mosaic mural, was relocated to its current location beneath Anzac Square in 1984, a move necessitated by the sale of Anzac House. The State Government Insurance Office (SGIO) took responsibility for moving the Shrine as part of a major project to redevelop Anzac Square. The SGIO in turn contracted the civil construction firm, Mostia Giselle Nominees, to effect the move.

The removal and relocation of the mosaic was accomplished with the assistance of second-generation Venetian mosaicist, Renato Gregorini, son of Goffredo Gregorini, the 'Master of all Venetian mosaicists'. Gregorini had been recruited following a lengthy world-wide search by the SGIO and the Queensland Government for an expert capable of effecting this painstaking and delicate operation. Gregorini had worked on some of the most important Byzantine mosaics of antiquity, and with this task became the first mosaicist in the world to achieve the removal and re-siting of a contemporary mosaic.

The mosaic remains the centrepiece of the Memorial Galleries (formerly known as the World War II Shrine of Memories), which were unveiled by the Queensland Governor, Sir James Ramsay, on 10 August 1984.

In 2019, the State Library of Queensland assumed responsibility for the curation of the World War II Memorial Galleries beneath Anzac Square, and in 2021 recorded an interview with Darryl Ross, the artist's son, about the making of the mosaic. The mosaic is uncovered once a year for a two-week period, on the occasion of the artist's birthday, 15 January.
