= Shrine of Remembrance, Brisbane =

War memorial in Brisbane, Australia

Shrine of Remembrance
- Australia
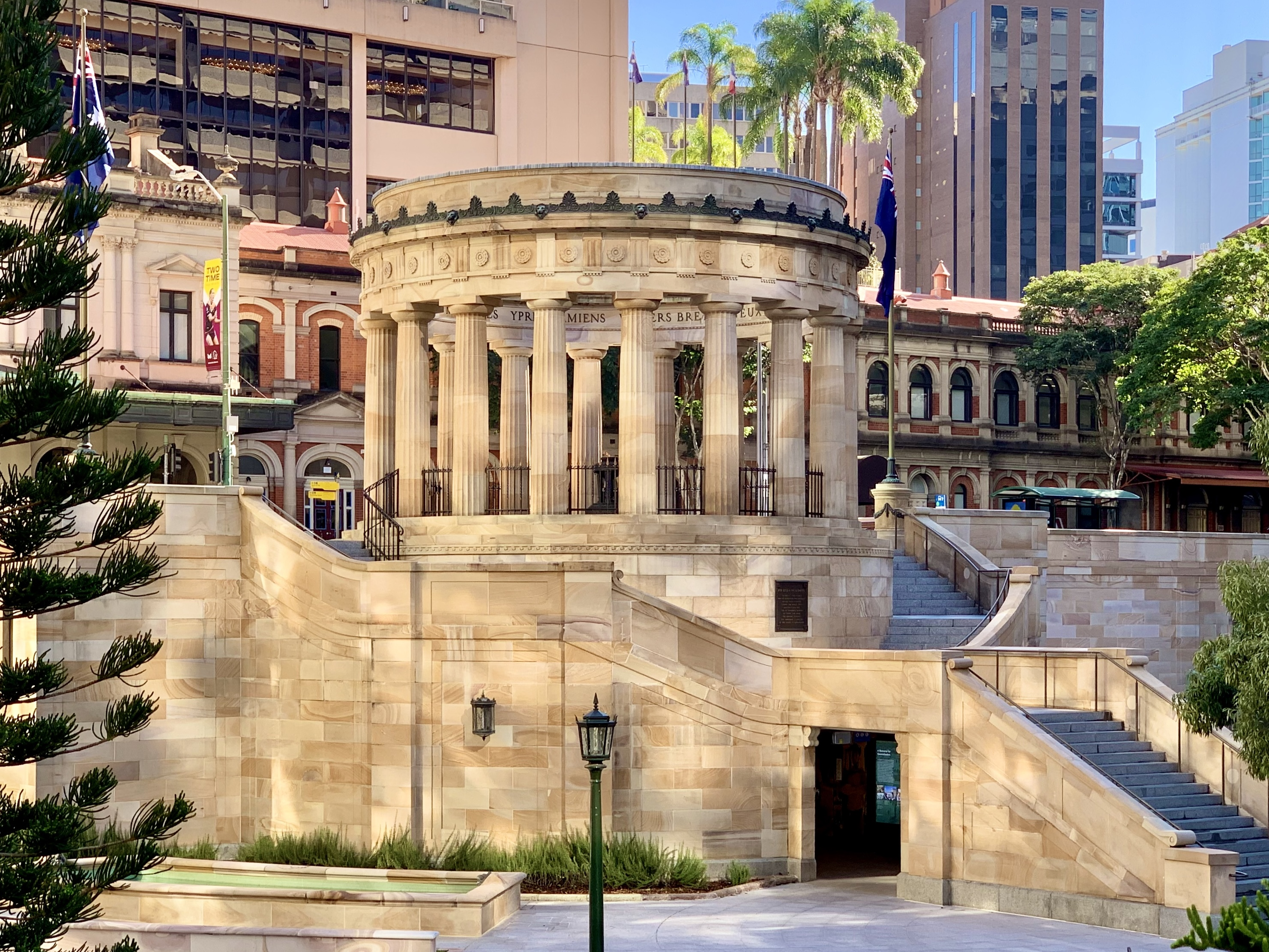
- Shrine of Remembrance monument and the Eternal Flame; ANZAC Square façade
- For the Australian soldiers of all wars including World War I
- Unveiled: 11 November 1930
- Location: 27°27′58.79″S 153°01′35.27″E; Brisbane
- Designed by: Buchanan and Cowper

The Shrine of Remembrance is located in ANZAC Square, between Ann Street and Adelaide Street, in Brisbane, Queensland, Australia. With its 'Eternal Flame', the Shrine is a war memorial dedicated to the Australian and New Zealand Army Corps (Anzacs).

The Shrine of Remembrance is a major Brisbane landmark of cultural, architectural and historic importance and is a key component of the Queensland Heritage listed square and annually hosts ceremonies for ANZAC Day and Armistice Day (now referred to as Remembrance Day). A service marking Singapore Day (The Fall of Singapore, 15 February 1942) is held annually on the closest Sunday to the 15th, in remembrance of the losses of the 8th Division during World War 2.

== History ==
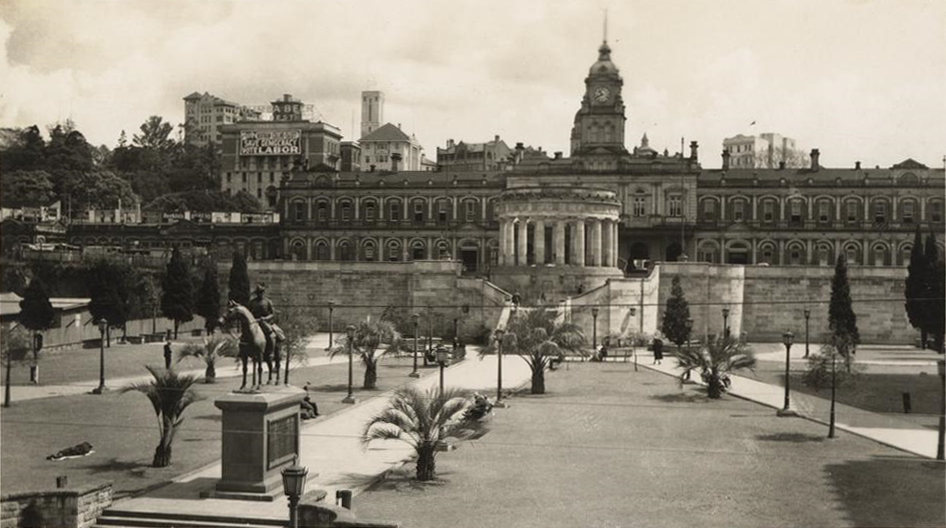
Anzac Square and the Shrine of Remembrance c1930

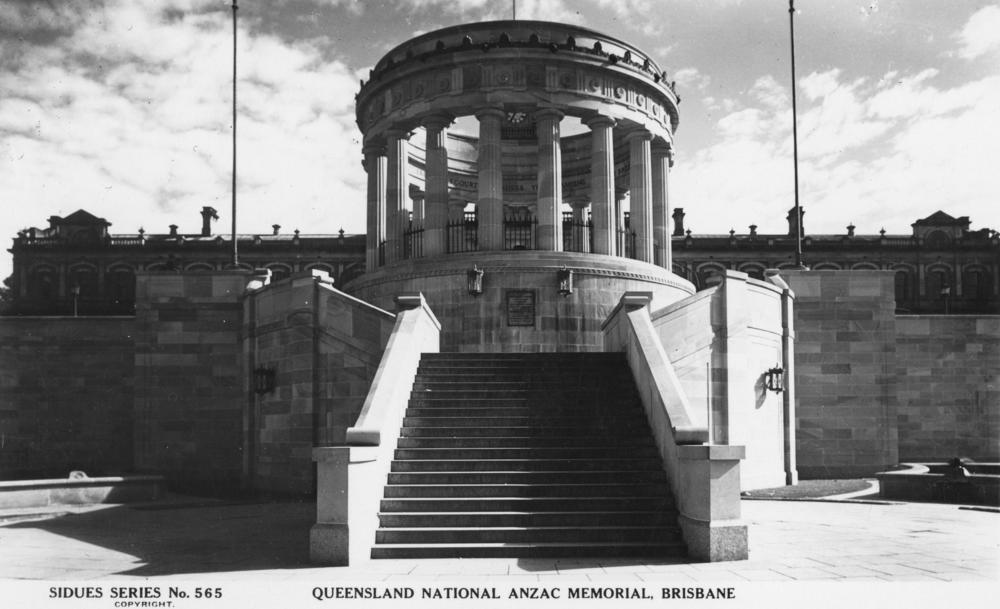
Anzac Memorial, Brisbane, ca. 1939

Funds were raised by public subscription for a memorial to fallen soldiers in World War I and in 1928 a competition was held for its design. The competition was won by Sydney architects Buchanan and Cowper who proposed a Greek Revival structure. The Shrine took two years to build and was dedicated on Armistice Day 11 November 1930 by Governor John Goodwin with a dedication plaque.

== Architecture ==
Designed in the Greek Classic Revival style by the firm of Buchanan & Cowper, the columns of the Shrine of Remembrance are built of Helidon sandstone, and the Eternal Flame is kept in a brass urn within the Shrine. The steps leading to the Shrine of Remembrance from ANZAC Square are made of Queensland granite. The 18 columns of the Shrine symbolise the year 1918, when hostilities ceased.

== Memorial ==
There is a crypt in the lower section of the Shrine of Remembrance which contains the World War I and World War II Memorial Galleries (formerly known as the 'Shrine of Memories'), which contains memorial plaques to numerous Australian regiments who fought during these campaigns, as well as a large mosaic mural by artist Don Ross. There is also a World War I memorial sculpture on the Shrine of Memories external wall.

== Refurbishment ==
The Lord Mayor of Brisbane, Graham Quirk, announced in the Brisbane City Council newsletter "Living in Brisbane", May edition, 2014, that, in partnership with the Queensland Government, structural repair works are being undertaken with the Shrine of Remembrance memorial.

== Services and ceremonies ==
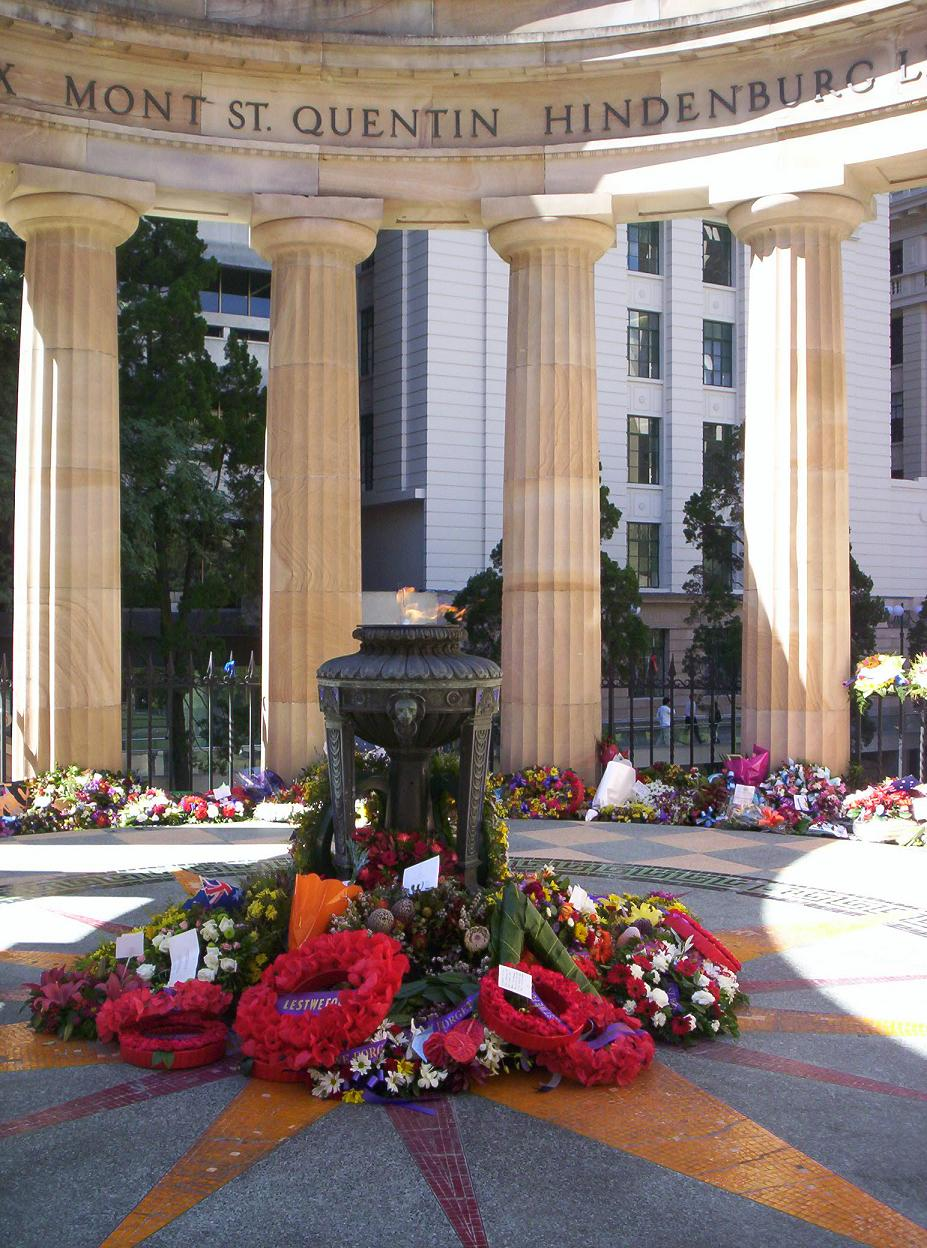
Wreaths around the Eternal Flame at the Shrine of Remembrance on ANZAC Day 2006

Each year, on ANZAC Day, on 25 April, a Dawn memorial service is held at the Shrine of Remembrance, with wreaths being laid around the 'Eternal Flame' in memory of those who died in conflict.

There is also a memorial service held each year on Remembrance Day, 11 November and wreaths are again laid at the 'Eternal Flame'.

== Gallery ==
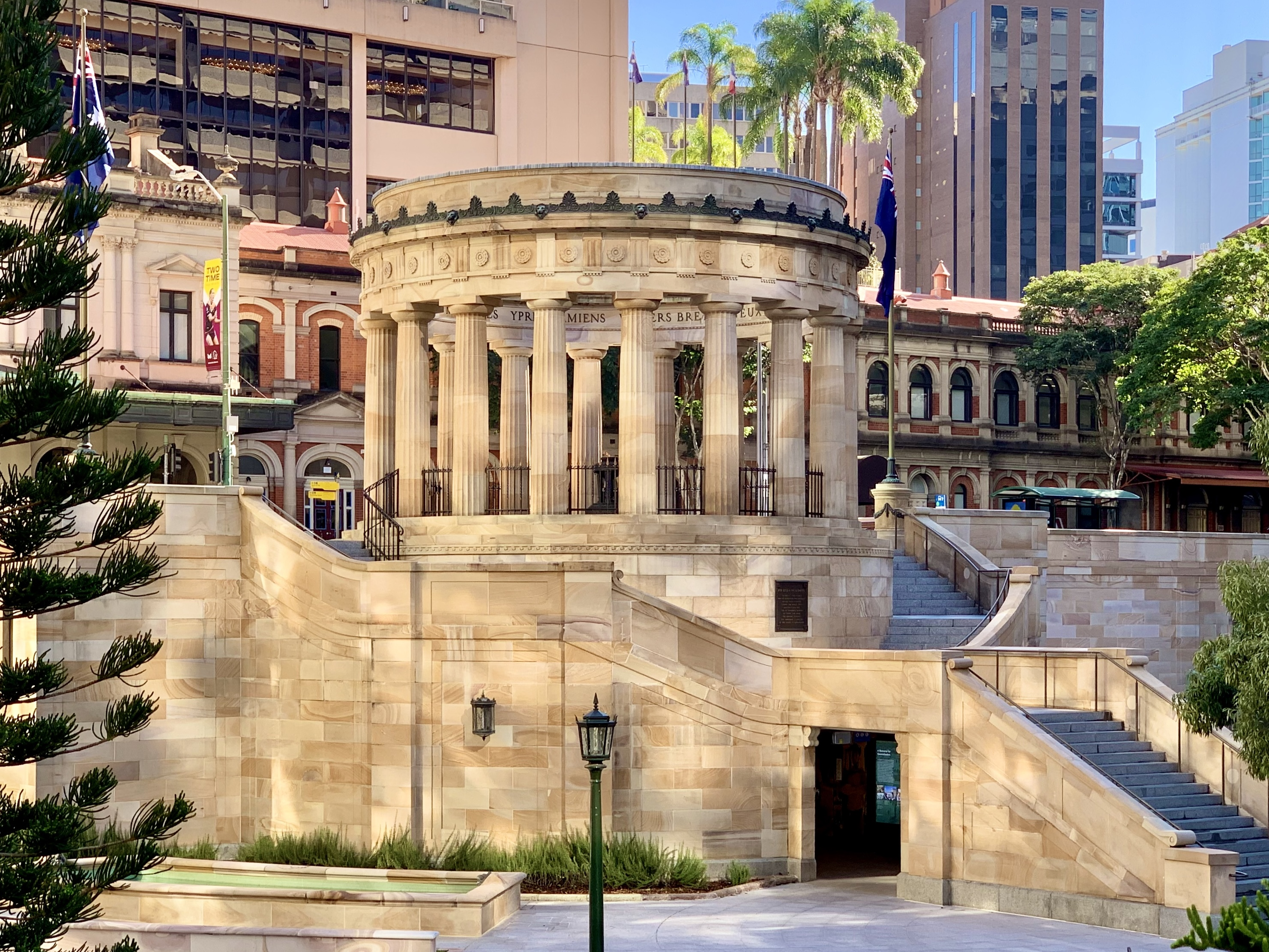
Shrine of Remembrance ANZAC Square façade, showing the lower section which contains the crypt with the World War II Memorial Galleries

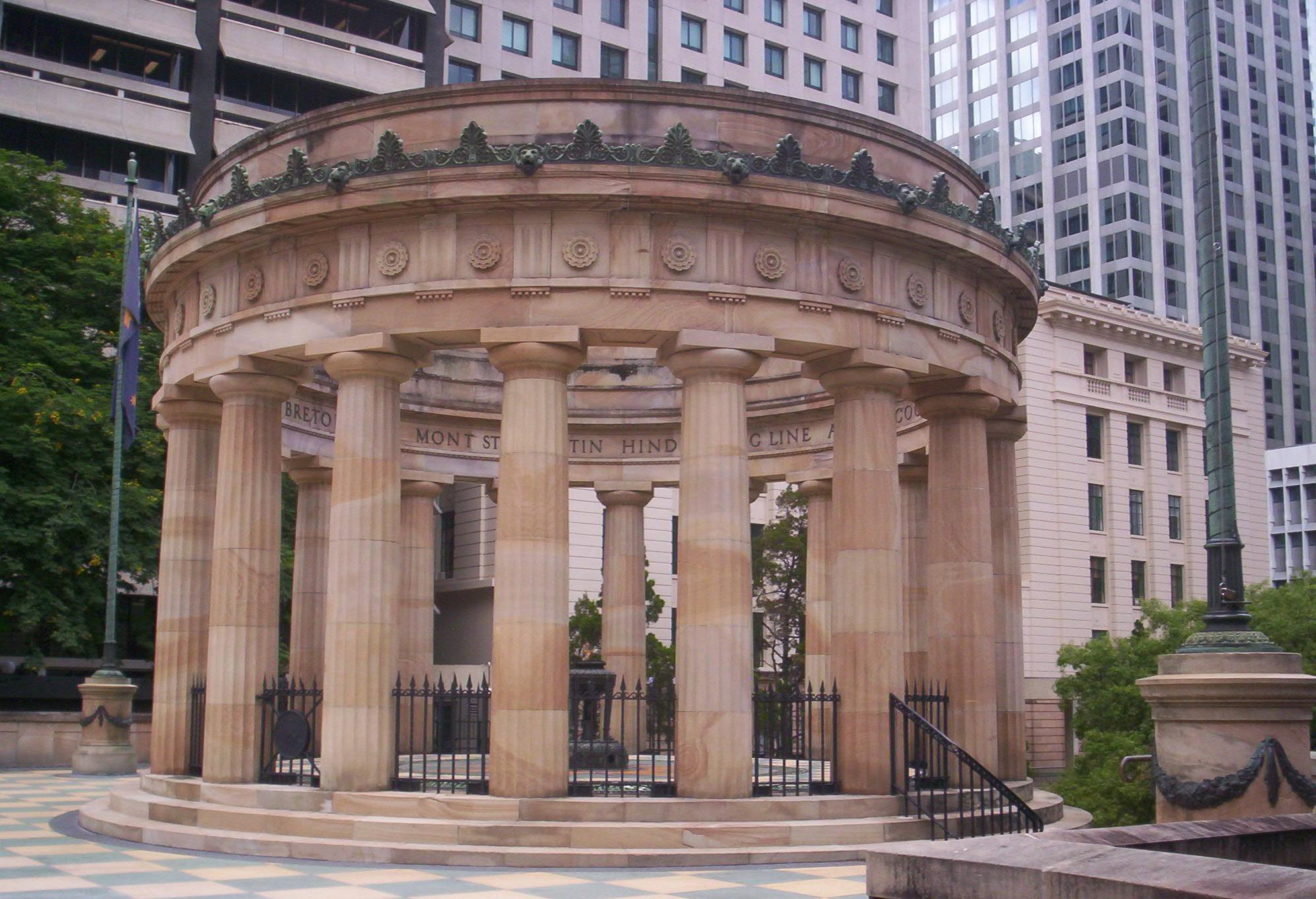
Shrine of Remembrance, Ann Street, Brisbane façade

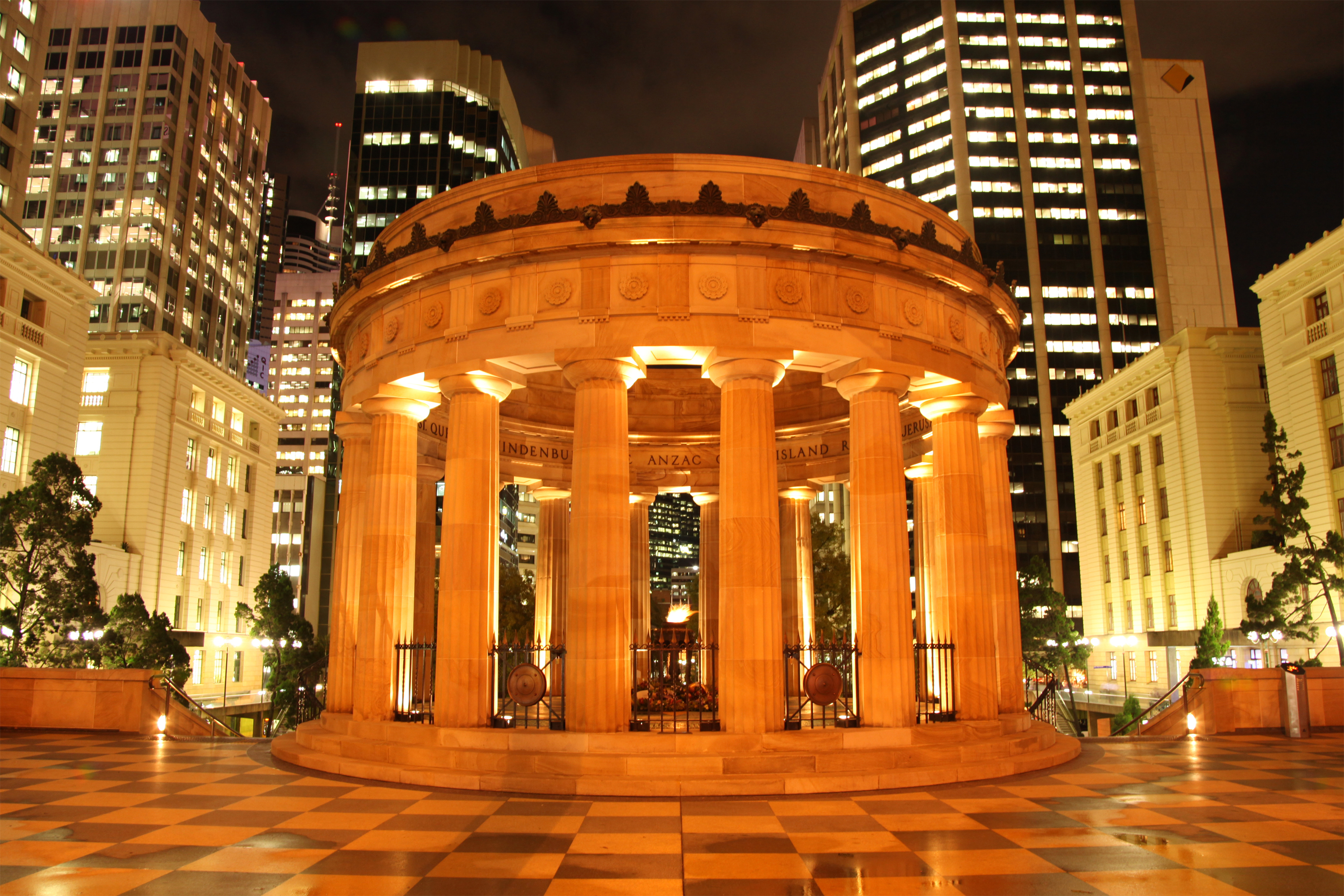
Shrine of Remembrance taken from Ann Street Brisbane at night
on 31 May 2012

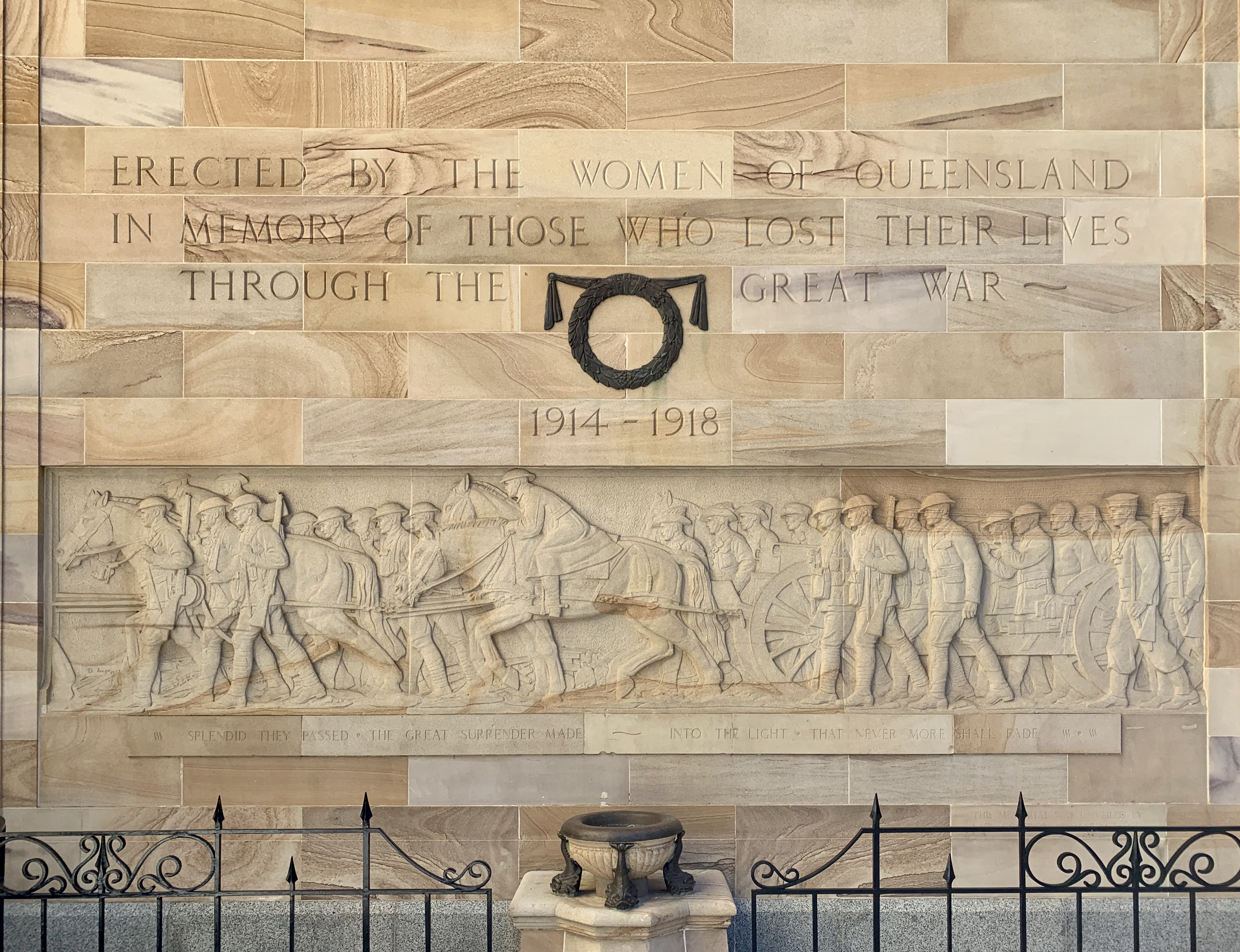
World War I Memorial Sculpture on the external wall of the Shrine of Memories section of the Shrine of Remembrance

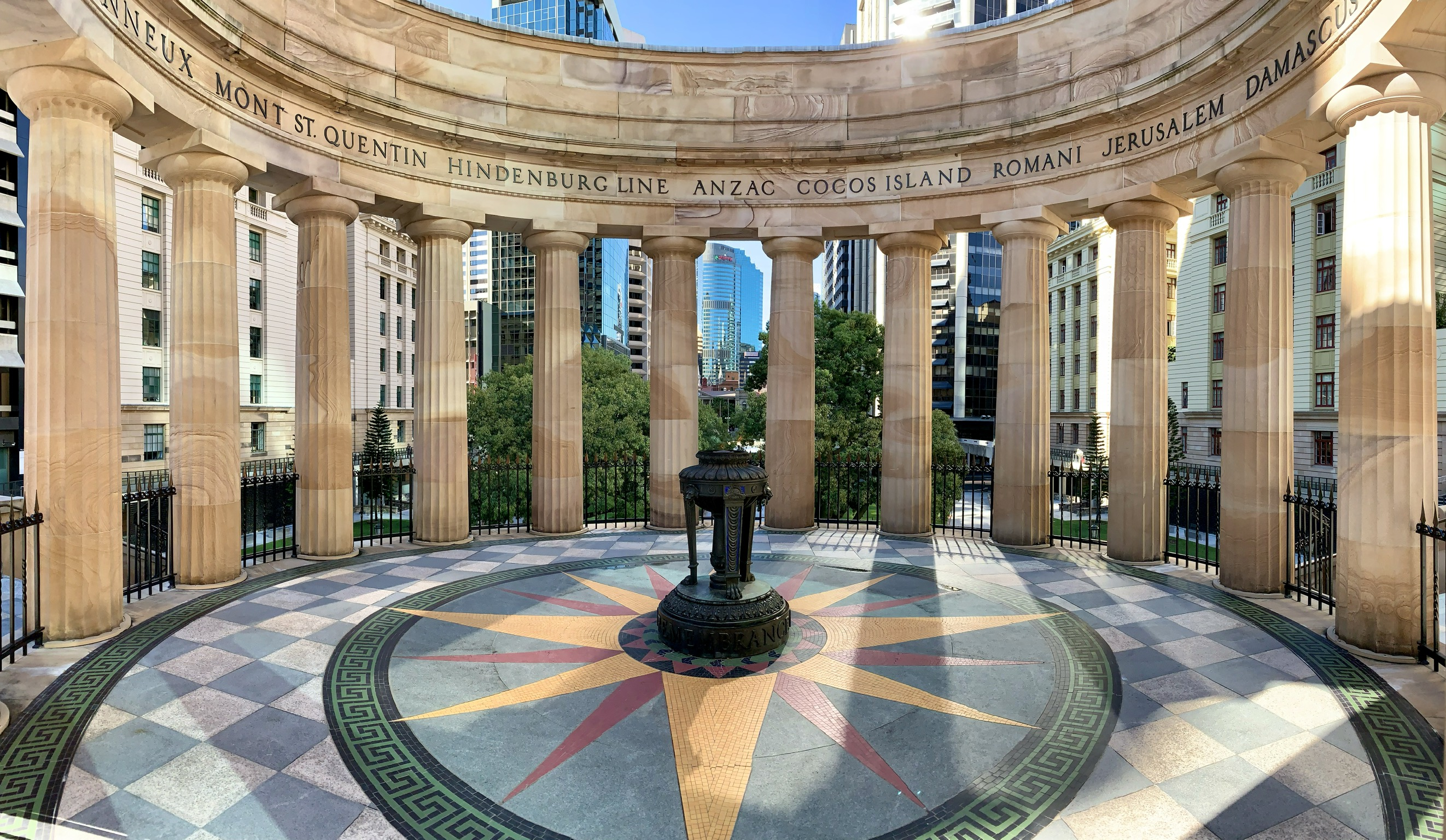
Eternal Flame feature of the Shrine of Remembrance

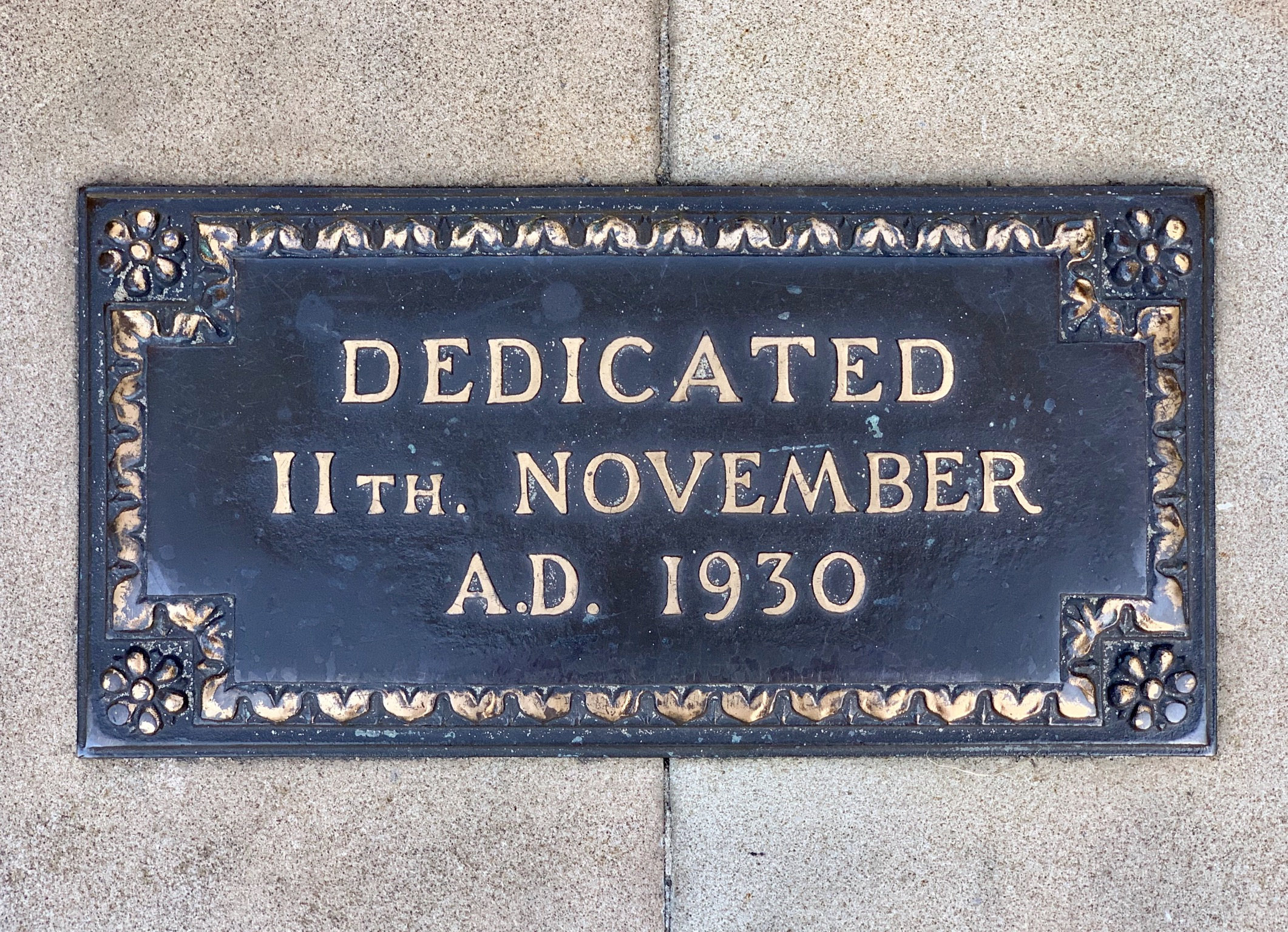
11 November 1930 dedication plaque – Shrine of Remembrance

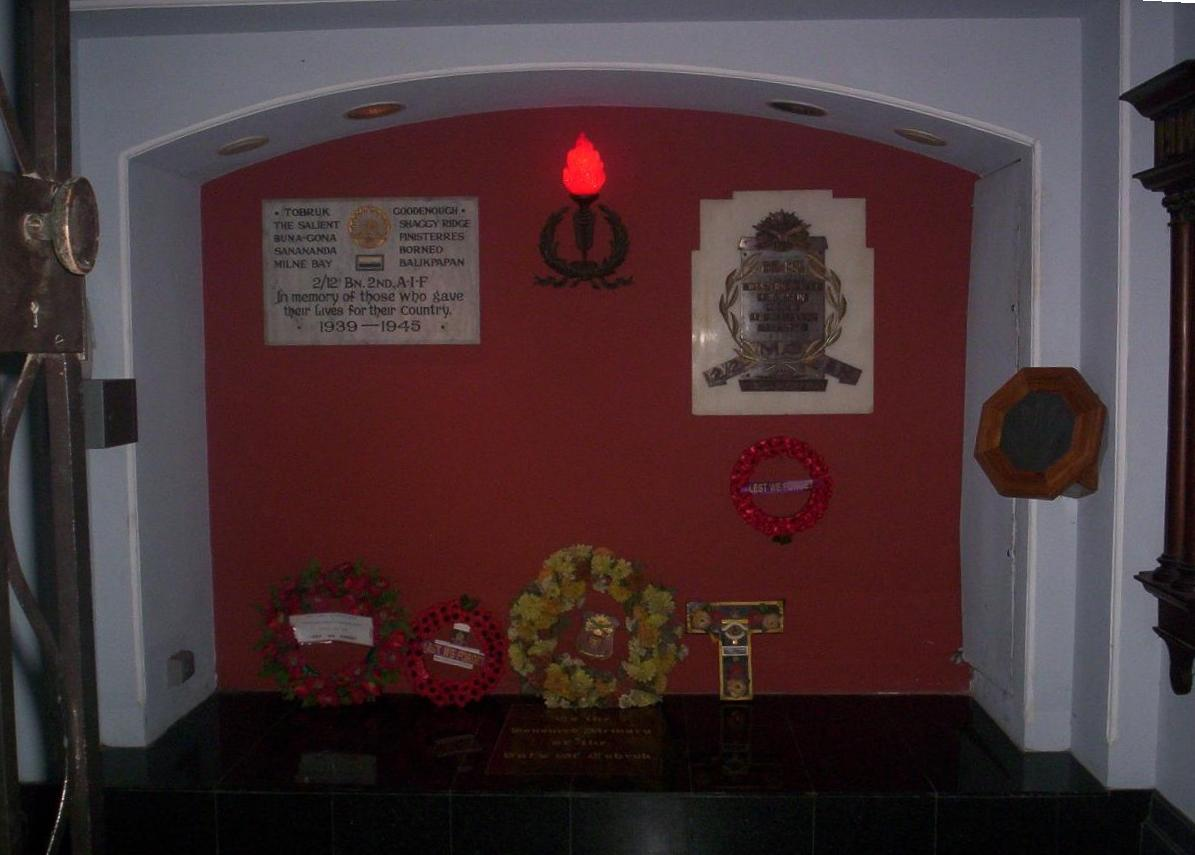
Inside the World War II Memorial Galleries (formerly known as the 'Shrine of Memories')

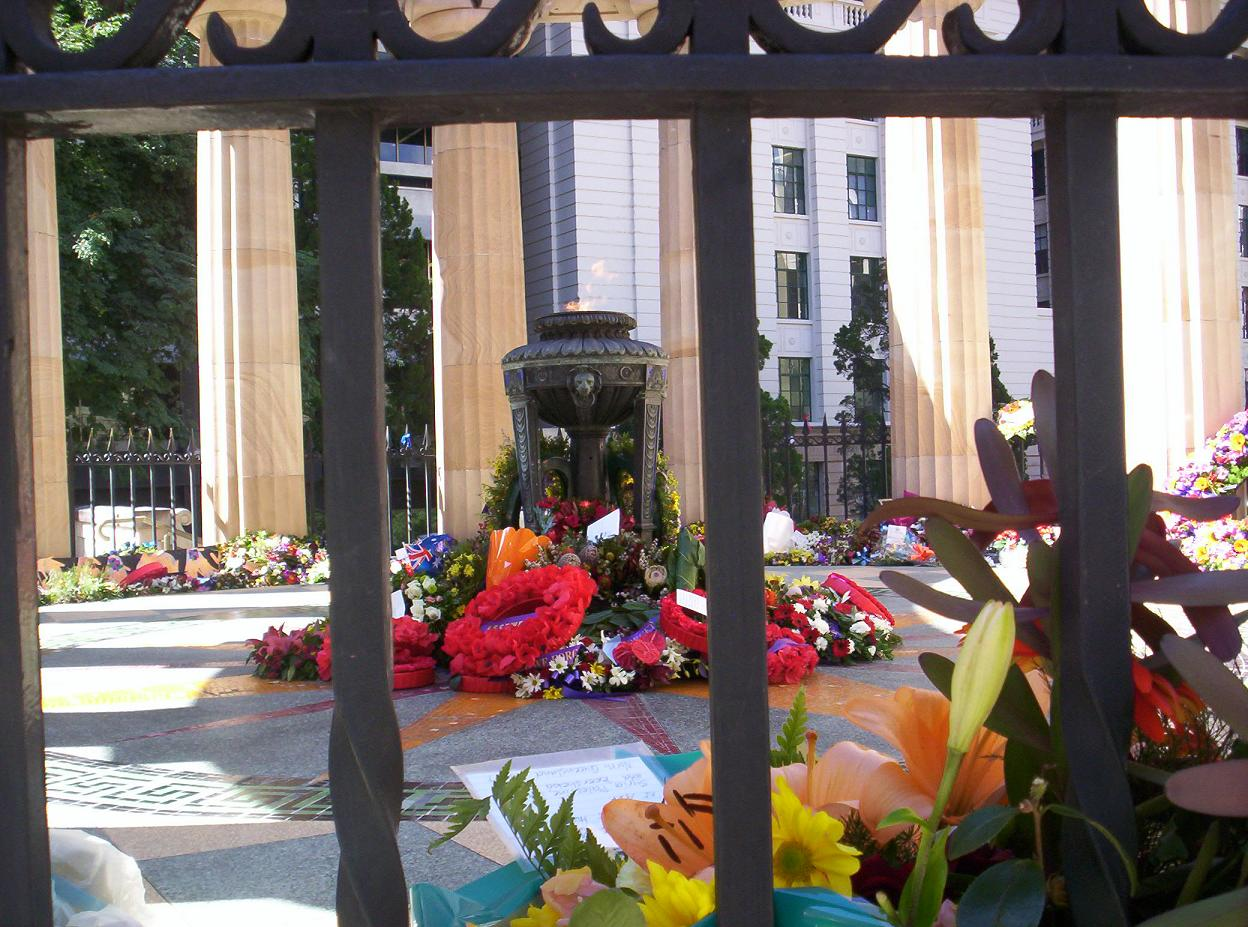
Wreaths at the Shrine of Remembrance, Brisbane, on ANZAC Day 2006

== See also ==
- ANZAC Cove, a small cove on the Gallipoli peninsula in Turkey
- ANZAC spirit, a component of modern Australasian mythology describing the spirit of mateship and cheerful suffering amongst Australians and New Zealanders
