= ANZAC Square, Brisbane =

Heritage-listed war memorial in Brisbane, Queensland

Anzac Square, Brisbane
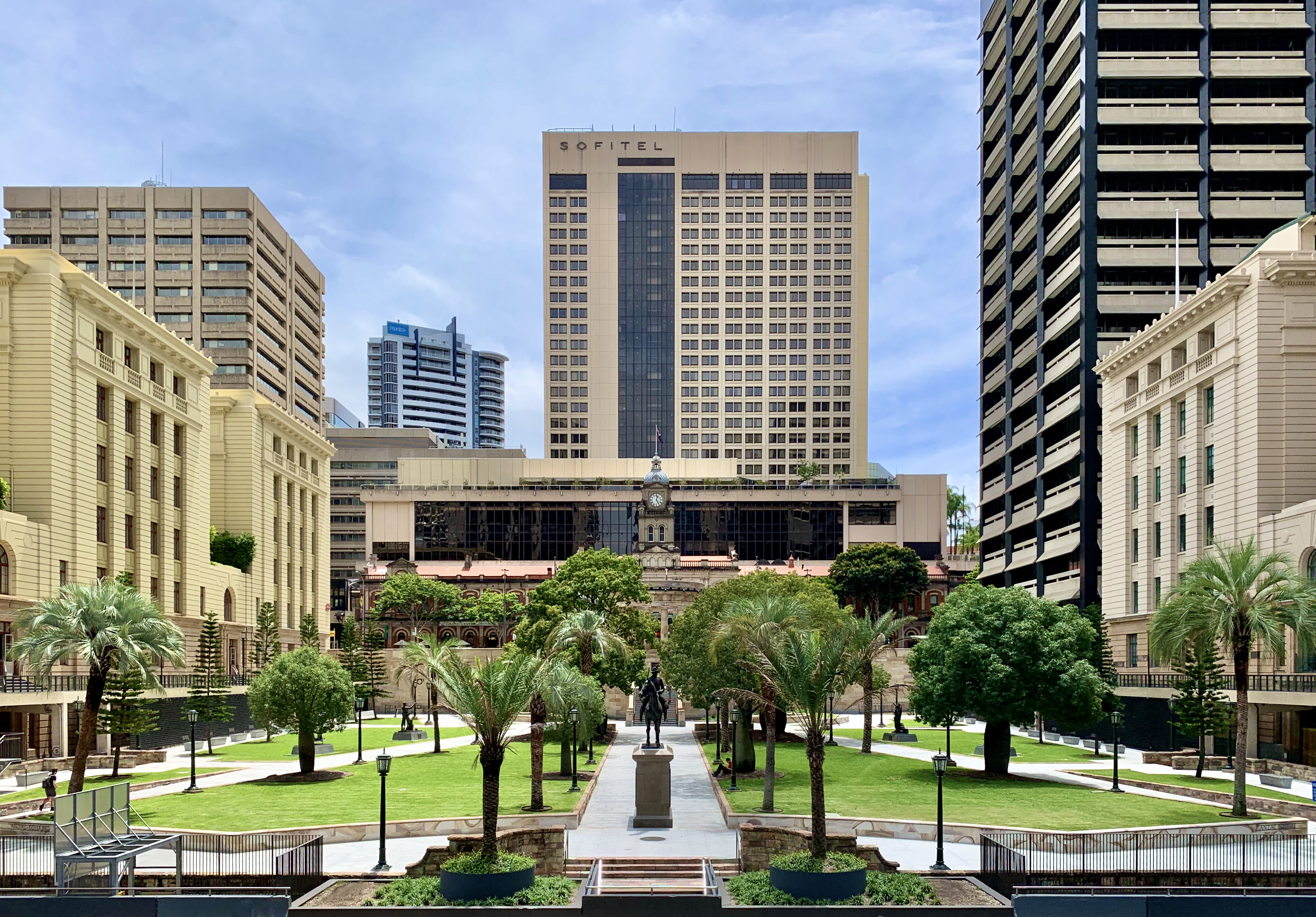
- ANZAC Square—the statue in the centre of the photo is a memorial to Queenslanders who fought during the Second Boer War—1899–1902

- Location within Queensland Location within Australia
- 27.4665°S 153.0266°E
- Location: 228 Adelaide Street, Brisbane City, City of Brisbane, Queensland, Australia

History
- Design period: 1919–1930s (interwar period)
- Built: 1928–1988

Site notes
- Owner: Brisbane City Council

Queensland Heritage Register
- Official name: Anzac Square, 9th Battalion Memorial Anzac Square, Queensland Women's War Memorial
- Type: state heritage (built)
- Designated: 21 October 1992
- Reference no.: 600062
- Significant period: 1928–1988 (historical); 1928–1939 (park & memorials); 1988 (Korean & Vietnam War memorials); 1928–
- Significant components: drinking fountain, pathway/walkway, memorial flame, memorial park, sculpture, shrine, wall/s, crypt / vault, steps/stairway, memorial surrounds/railings, memorial tree/avenue of trees

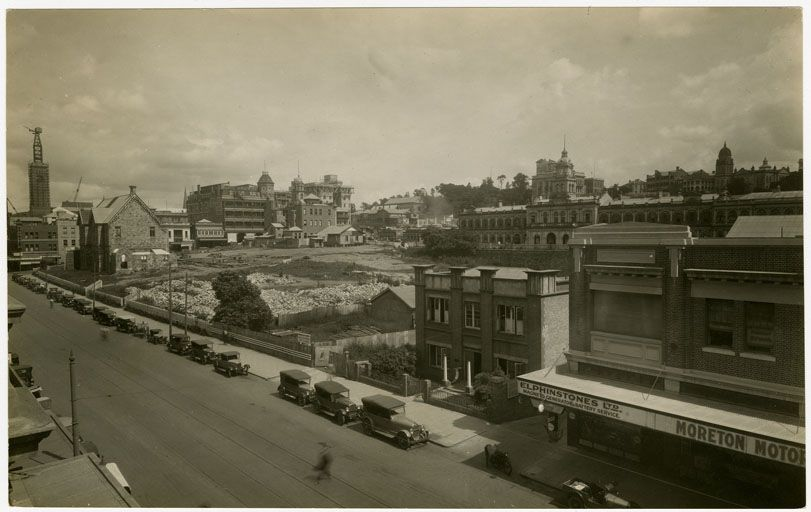
Anzac Square construction site, looking along Adelaide Street towards City Hall, 1929

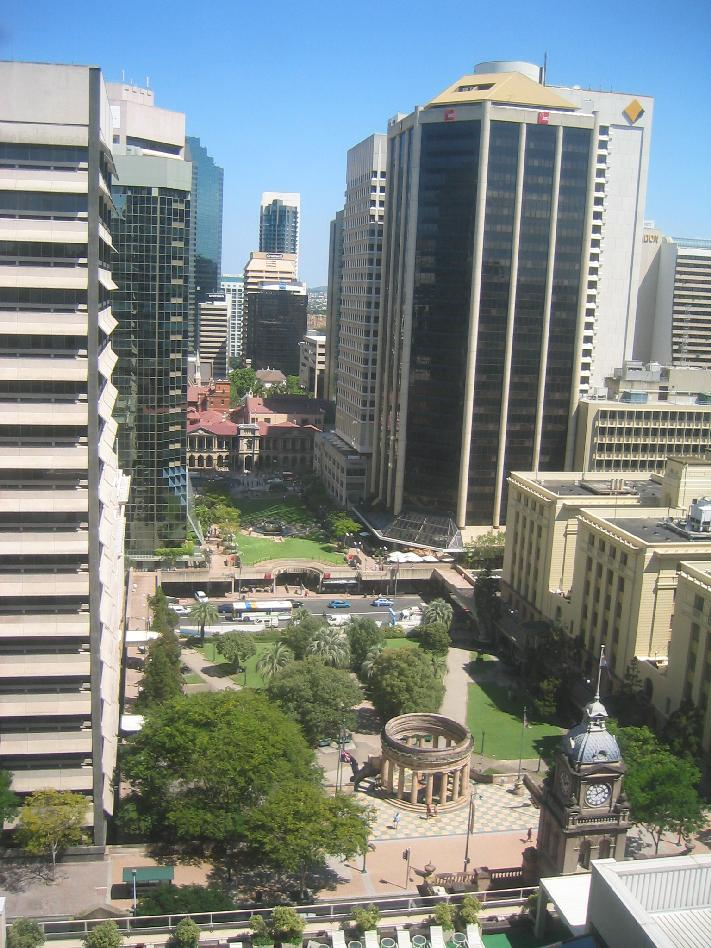
ANZAC Square, the Shrine of Remembrance and the Brisbane CBD

ANZAC Square is a heritage-listed town square and war memorial located between Ann Street and Adelaide Street (opposite Post Office Square), in Brisbane, Queensland, Australia. It is a state memorial to the men and women who participated in overseas armed service and is named in honour of the Australian and New Zealand Army Corps. ANZAC Square is adjacent to ANZAC Square Arcade.

ANZAC Square was opened on Armistice Day, 1930. It is also known as 9th Battalion Memorial and Queensland Women's War Memorial. ANZAC Square was registered on the (now inactive) Register of the National Estate in 1980 and added to the Queensland Heritage Register on 21 October 1992.

ANZAC Square contains the Shrine of Remembrance and the 'Eternal Flame of Remembrance' held in a continuously lit bronze urn, dedicated on Tuesday, 11 November 1930.

There is also the World War II Shrine of Memories. Daphne Mayo sculptured the Women's War Memorial that forms part of the memorial's wall.

The external wall of the Shrine of Memories is dedicated to the 60,000 Queenslanders who fought in World War I. There are also war-related statues, for various wars, including memorial statues for the Queensland soldiers who fought during the Second Boer War (1899–1902), as well as World War II, the Vietnam War and campaigns in Korea, Borneo and New Guinea.

On 27 May 2022, a sculptural memorial to Queensland's Aboriginal and Torres Strait Islander service men and women, designed by Wakka Wakka artist, John Smith Gumbula and sculptor Liam Hardy, was added to Anzac Square. Cast in bronze, the memorial features life-size figures standing on a 'Journey Stone'. Navy, Army and Air Force are represented alongside Aboriginal and Torres Strait Islander warriors and dancers, depicting a story of embarkation from home via air, land and sea. State Library of Queensland holds a collection of videos relating to the making of this memorial.

On 25 April, every year, a Dawn Service is held at the Shrine of Remembrance and ANZAC Square.

== Symbolism ==
Some of the symbolism used are as follows:

- the 18 columns of the Shrine represent the year of peace after World War 1—1918.
- also symbolizing the year (1918) are the number of stairs leading up to the shrine—19 stairs in the first row and 18 stairs in the second row.
- the bottle trees commemorate the Queensland Light Horse Regiments, which served in South Africa's Boer War (1899–1902).
- the palm trees are Middle East date palms and they represent Australia's success in the Middle East during both World Wars. Palms are also a biblical symbol of victory.
- the three paths from the bottom of the stairs represent the three services (Army, Navy, Airforce)

== History ==
Australia's involvement in World War I exacted a heavy toll in death and injury. Of a relatively small population of about five million people, 60,000 troops were killed and 152,000 wounded. Australia's casualty rate of 68.5% was the highest of the Allied forces.

The idea of a large memorial park and monument in the centre of the city commemorating those who had participated and died in the Great War was first raised in 1916. The original plan was to use the whole city block bounded by Ann, Edward, Adelaide and Creek Streets for the square but as negotiations with Federal, State and local governments continued throughout the early 1920s, a smaller site was determined. In 1928 State and Federal governments agreed to grant lands for the square and to erect flanking buildings to a co-ordinated design.

Anzac Square commemorates all Queenslanders who participated in war, not just Brisbane residents. In 1928 a competition for the design of a Shrine of remembrance was won by Sydney architects Buchanan and Cowper. Construction proceeded over the following two years and on Armistice Day 11 November 1930, the Governor of Queensland, Sir John Goodwin, dedicated the Shrine and the square. In 1933 the square was declared a Reserve for Park purposes and the Brisbane City Council was appointed trustee of the site.

In 1932 the Queensland Women's War Memorial was unveiled. This memorial was an initiative of the Brisbane Women's Club and funded by public subscription. It was designed and executed by Daphne Mayo with assistance from George Harvey.

A memorial commissioned by the 9th Battalion (AIF) Association was mounted in the Crypt and unveiled by the Australian Governor-General Lord Gowrie on 17 August 1937. Commemorating the battalion's 45 officers and 1048 other ranks who lost their lives in the war, it was undertaken by former Brisbane sculptor William Leslie Bowles at a cost of £500. Bowles was noted for his memorial work, having been head sculptor at the Australian War Memorial in Canberra during the years 1924 to 1931.

In 1939 a memorial commemorating Queenslanders who served in the South Africa conflict 1899 to 1902 was relocated to the square. This memorial, featuring a fully equipped mounted trooper originally stood near the intersection of Turbot and Edward Streets. It was designed by James Watts and sat on a pedestal constructed by local firm Lowther & Sons.

During the 1960s and 1970s various proposals were made to alter the square as part of the redevelopment of property on the opposite side of Adelaide Street. These plans met with considerable public resistance. After a protracted public debate, a compromise plan involving limited encroachment on Anzac Square was agreed upon. This work was completed by 1984 and included the construction of a pair of elevated pedestrian bridges to Post Office Square, enlarging the crypt under the Shrine, and the realignment of the Adelaide Street entrance to the square.

Originally envisaged as a First World War memorial, Anzac Square has become a repository for memorials of other wars. In 1984 the Second World War Shrine of Memories was relocated in the enlarged crypt under the Shrine and during 1988 memorials to those who served in the Korean and Vietnam wars were erected in the square.

Anzac Square remains as the focus of armed services commemorations, particularly on Anzac Day.

== Description ==
Anzac Square, occupies an area of more than 0.5 hectares (1.2 acres) between Ann and Adelaide Streets. It lies in a band of pedestrian access space extending from Central Station through four city blocks. On the river side of Anzac Square are Post Office Square, the GPO precinct and St Stephens Cathedral grounds.

The square is formally arranged. From a small stone wall edged by formal gardens on Adelaide Street, three paths, separated by lawns and mature trees, converge on a large elevated Shrine at Ann Street. These paths represent the three branches of the armed forces, Army, Navy and Air Force. Trees along these paths include Palms, Bribie Island Pines and Bottle Trees – the latter were donated by Colonel Cameron, former Light Horseman and active lobbyist for the square.

A dominant feature of the square is the Shrine. It is an adaptation of the classical Greek temenos (sacred enclosure) and tholos (circular shrine) comprising a circular colonnade of Helidon sandstone on a three-tiered base of Queensland granite, and stands approximately 7 metres (23 ft) high on a paved forecourt extending to the Ann Street footpath. Eighteen Doric columns support a circular entablature externally ornamented with rosettes and internally inscribed with the names of battlefields where Australian soldiers fought. The colonnade is enclosed by cast iron railings that span the columns. Within the circular enclosure a bronze urn houses the Eternal Flame – a symbol of faithful remembrance.

Beneath the Shrine is a large crypt containing the Memorial Galleries, previously known as the Shrine of Memories, now managed by the State Library of Queensland. These Galleries are a memorial to those who served in the First World War, Second World War, and in various Queensland contingents of the armed forces. The mosaic mural by artist Don Ross is the centrepiece of the Memorial Galleries, and is available for viewing at various times of the year.

Twin stone staircases wrap around the Shrine, descending to the level of the square. On either side of the staircase are shallow tiled reflecting pools – symbols of tranquillity and renewed life. Large sandstone retaining walls rise from the lawns of the square to the footpath under the Shrine. The Queensland Women's War Memorial is located in the western wall of Anzac Square, below the Shrine of Remembrance. It consists of a relief panel in Helidon sandstone depicting a military procession. The panel is surmounted by a centrally placed bronze laurel wreath and the inscription "Erected by the women of Queensland in memory of those who lost their lives through The Great War 1914–1918". A sandstone and stone pedestal supports a bronze and sandstone drinking fountain mounted on upturned bronze dolphins – symbols of renewed life.

The equestrian memorial of the South African War dominates the entry to the central path at Adelaide Street. A life-size bronzed statue modeled on Lieutenant-Colonel Charles James Reade, it depicts a Queensland Mounted Infantryman on horseback. On two sides of the trachyte pedestal large bronze plaques contain the names of the eighty-nine Queensland soldiers who lost their lives in the South African war.

Memorials to the Korean and Vietnam wars are also located in the square. A memorial to Queensland’s Aboriginal and Torres Strait Islander service men and women was unveiled in the park on 27 May 2022.

The square is flanked by State Government Offices to the south and Commonwealth Government Offices on the north. These are generally of restrained classical design and sympathetic in scale to the space, except the 1970s Commonwealth Government highrise extension on Ann Street. They frame vistas through the square to the GPO in the east and Central Station to the west.

== Anzac Square restoration and enhancement ==
Beginning in 2014, Anzac Square underwent a major restoration and enhancement project. Stages 1, 2 and 3 of the project were a joint initiative by the Queensland Government and Brisbane City Council and were undertaken from 2014 to 2016. Stage 1 and 2 involved extensive restoration work to build a structurally sound exterior to the memorial site (stopping water infiltration into the substructure and walls), installing an electronic ignition system inside the Eternal Flame urn, during which time the Eternal Flame was relocated to the Parkland of Anzac Square and restorative work to stonework and paving.

Stage 3 involved significant enhancements to the crypt and memorial galleries. The spaces in the undercroft were renamed after the completion of Stage 3:

- World War I Memorial Crypt (previously the Shrine of Memories)
- World War II Gallery (previously Memorial Crypt)
- Post World War II Memorial and Exhibition Gallery (formerly the RSL Queensland Branch headquarters)

The two memorial galleries house digitised material curated by State Library of Queensland, enhanced with interactive digital experiences including touchscreens and timelines.

== Gallery ==
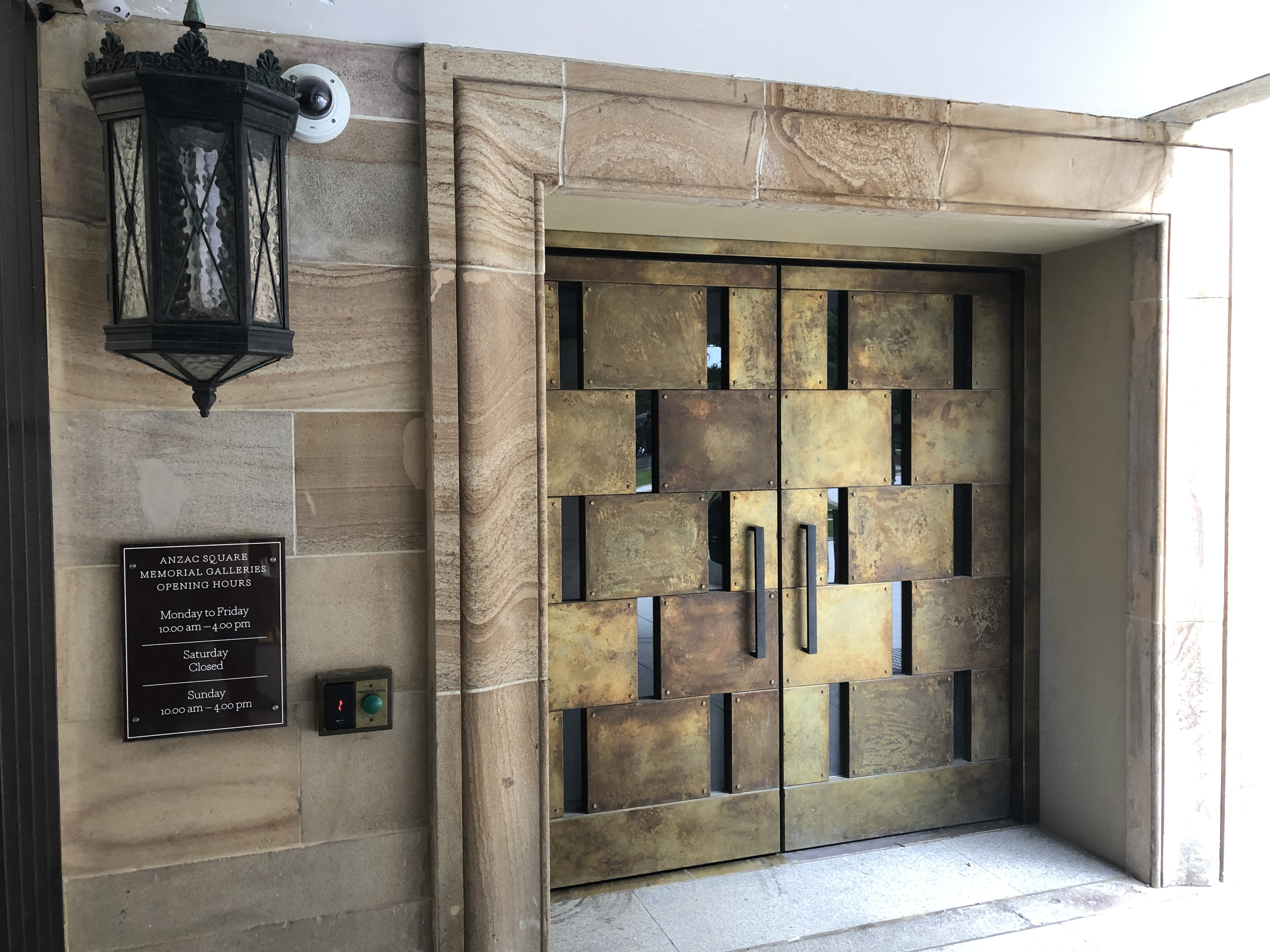
The entrance and opening hours were updated as part of the Anzac Square restoration and enhancement project completed in 2019.

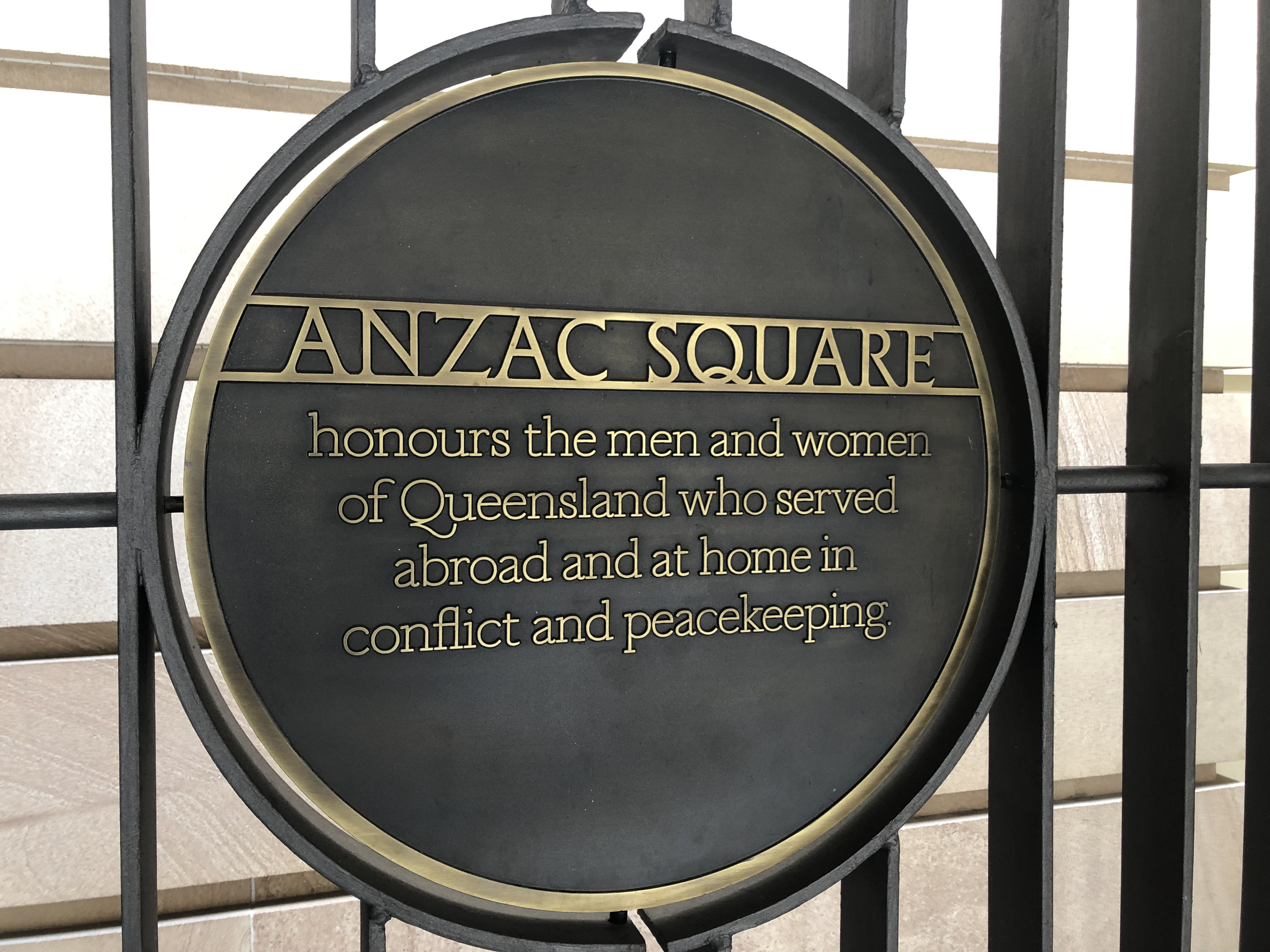
The entrance plaque was updated as part of the Anzac Square restoration and enhancement project completed in 2019.

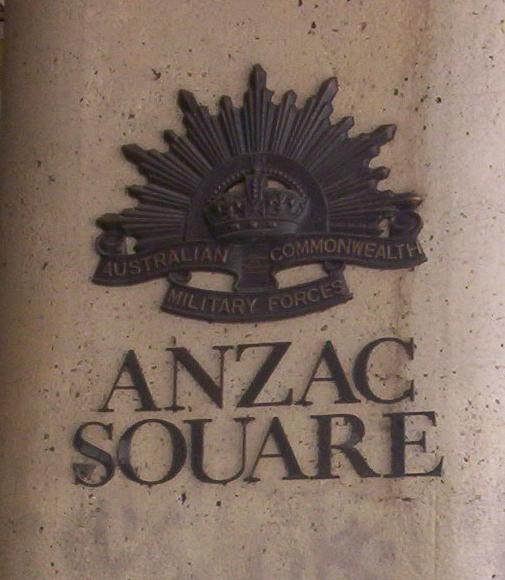
ANZAC Square sign

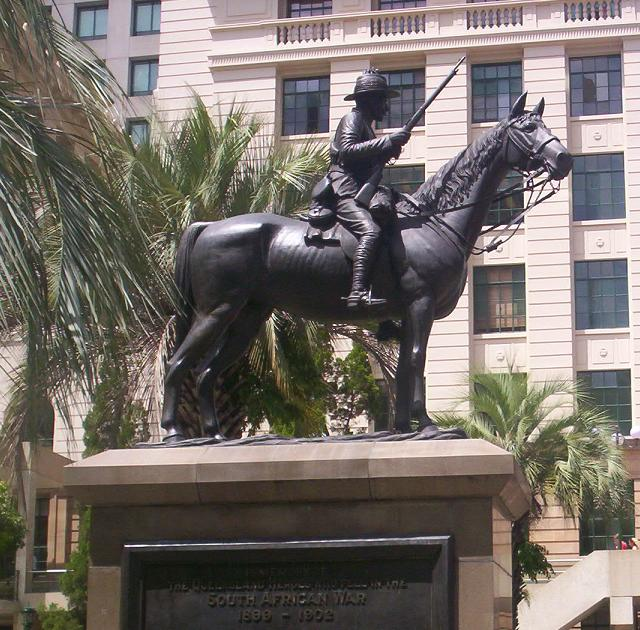
Second Boer War
Memorial Statue

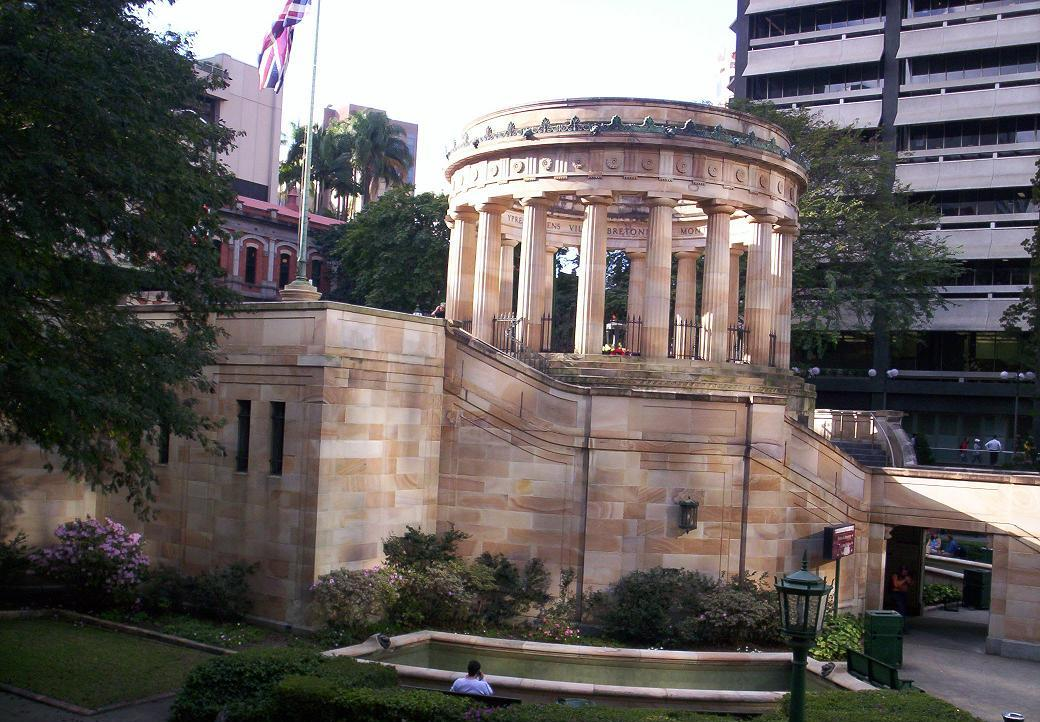
Shrine of Remembrance ANZAC Square façade, showing the lower section which contains the crypt with the World War II Shrine of Memories

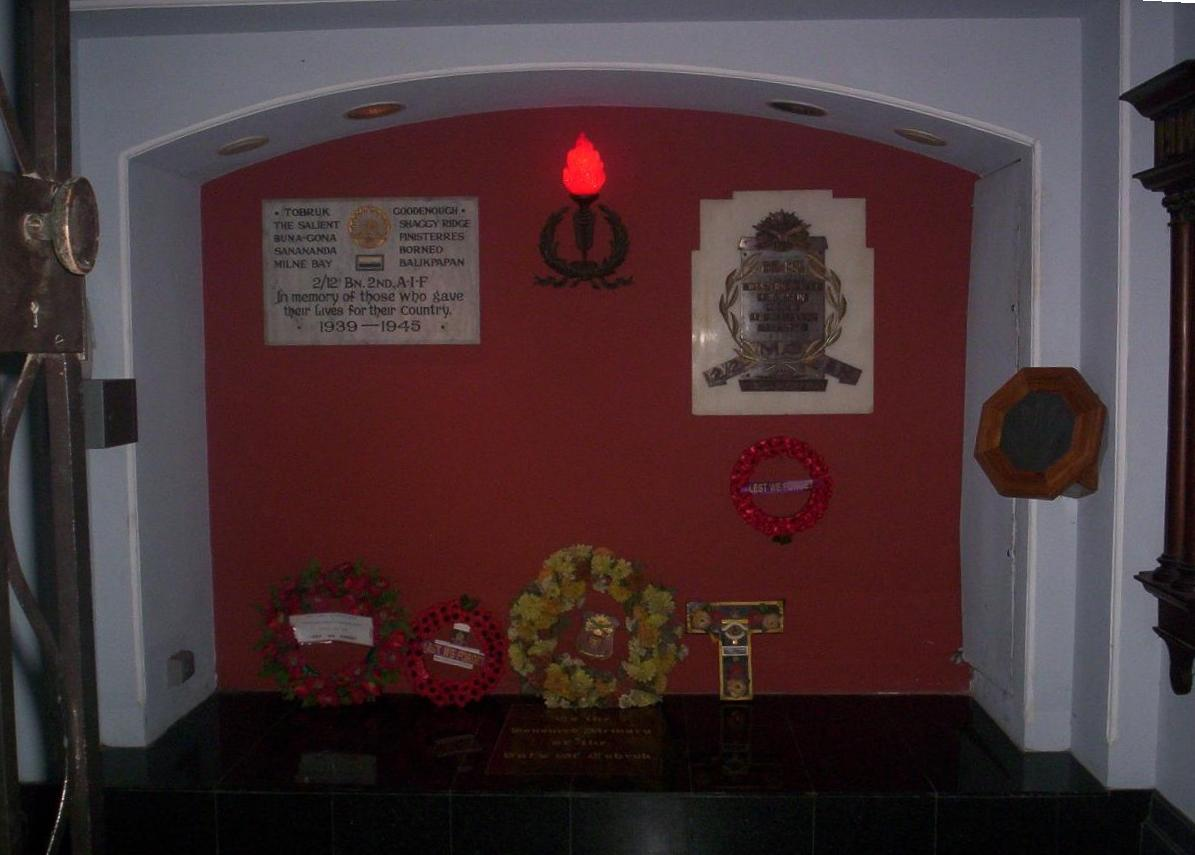
Inside the Shrine of Memories

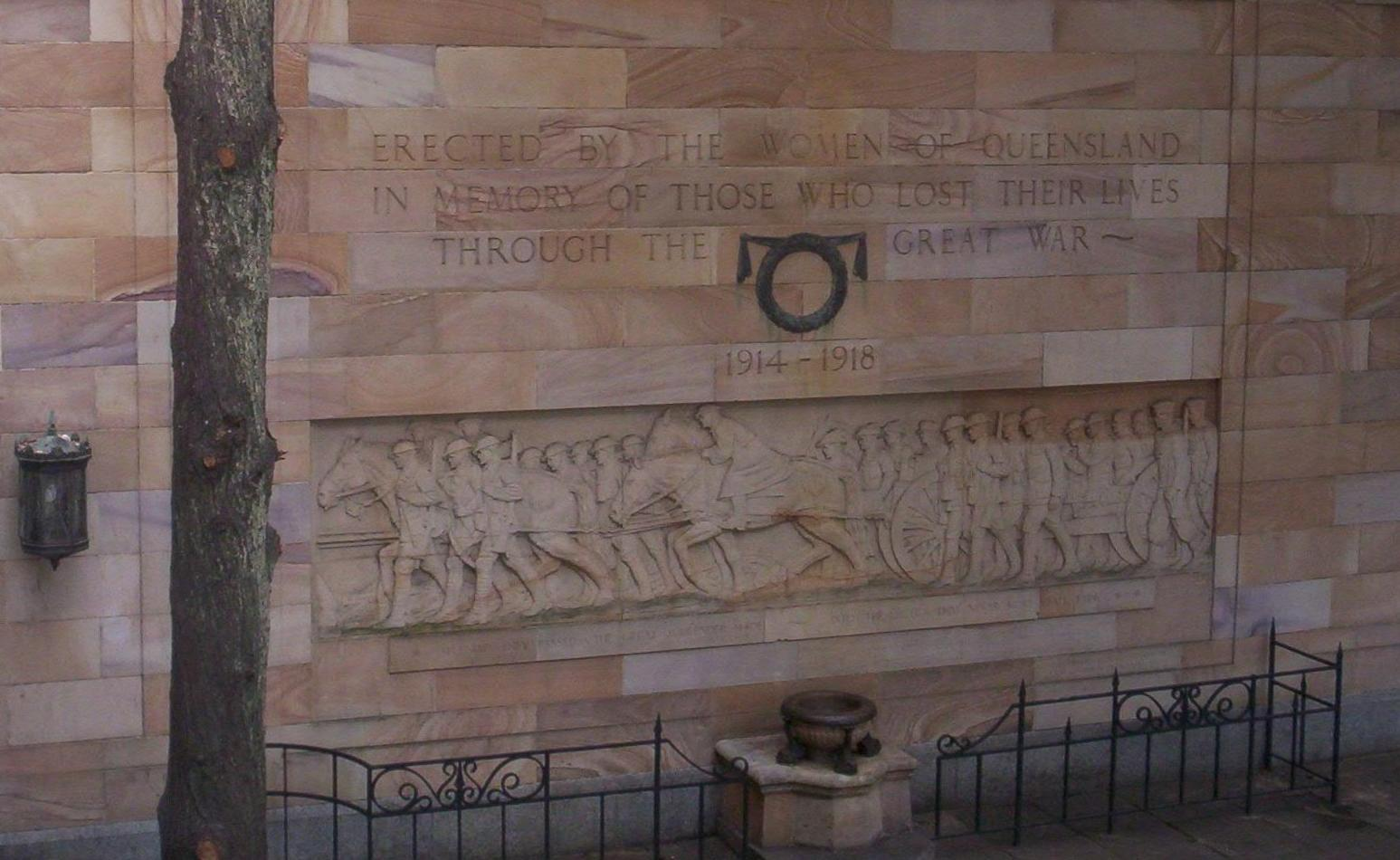
World War I Memorial Sculpture on the external wall of the Shrine of Memories section of the Shrine of Remembrance

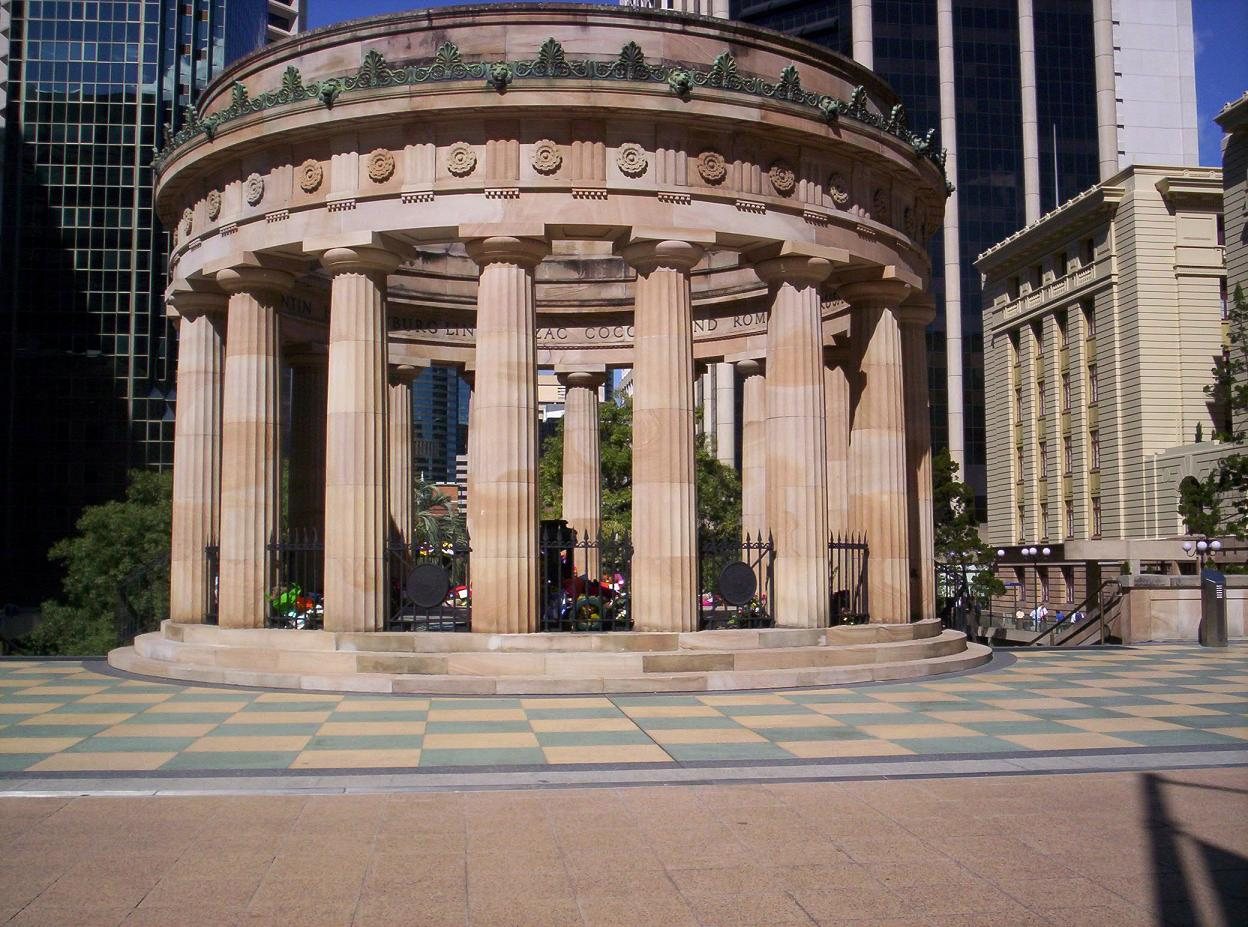
Shrine of Remembrance, Ann Street façade

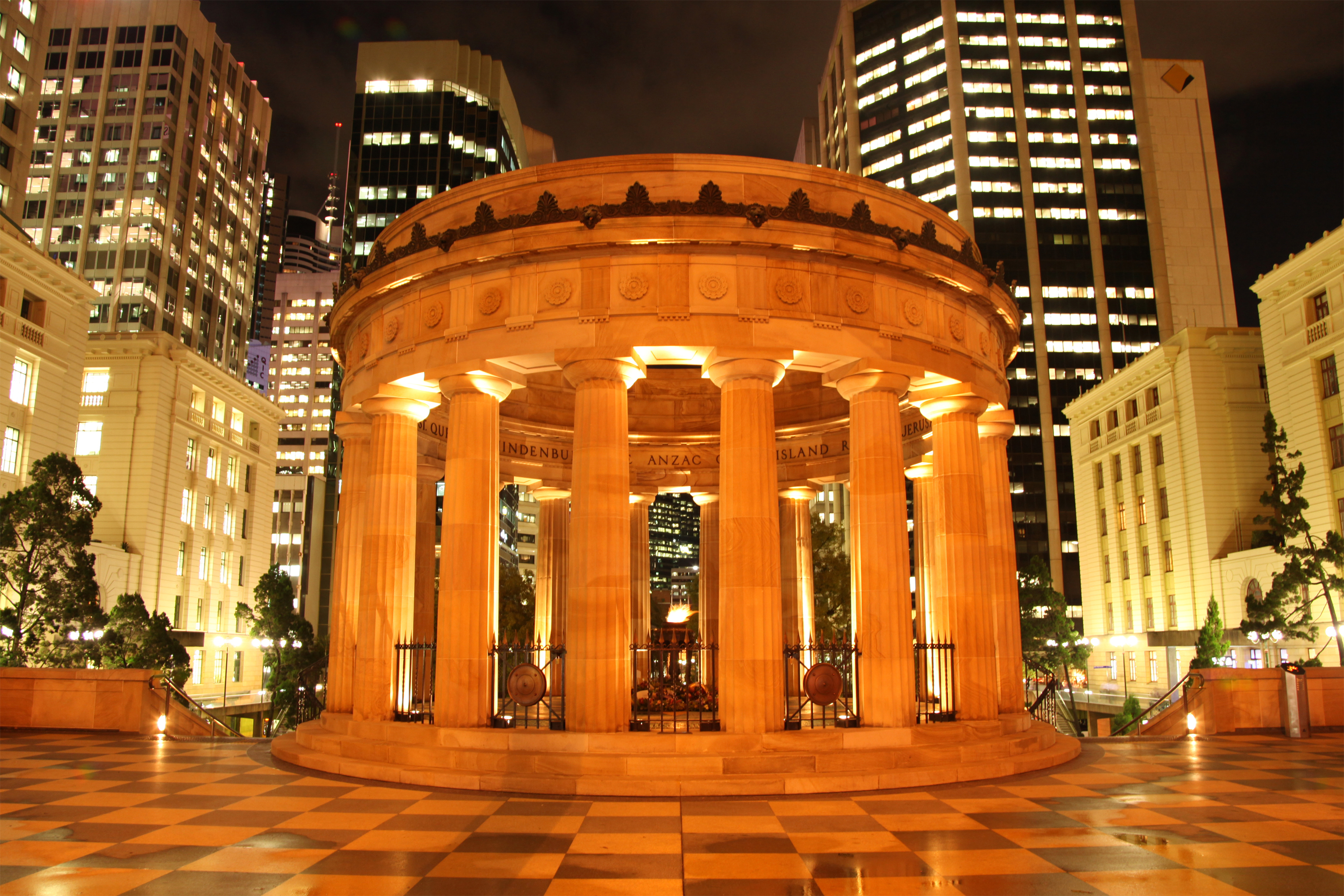
ANZAC Square Shrine of Remembrance at night, taken from Ann Street, Brisbane

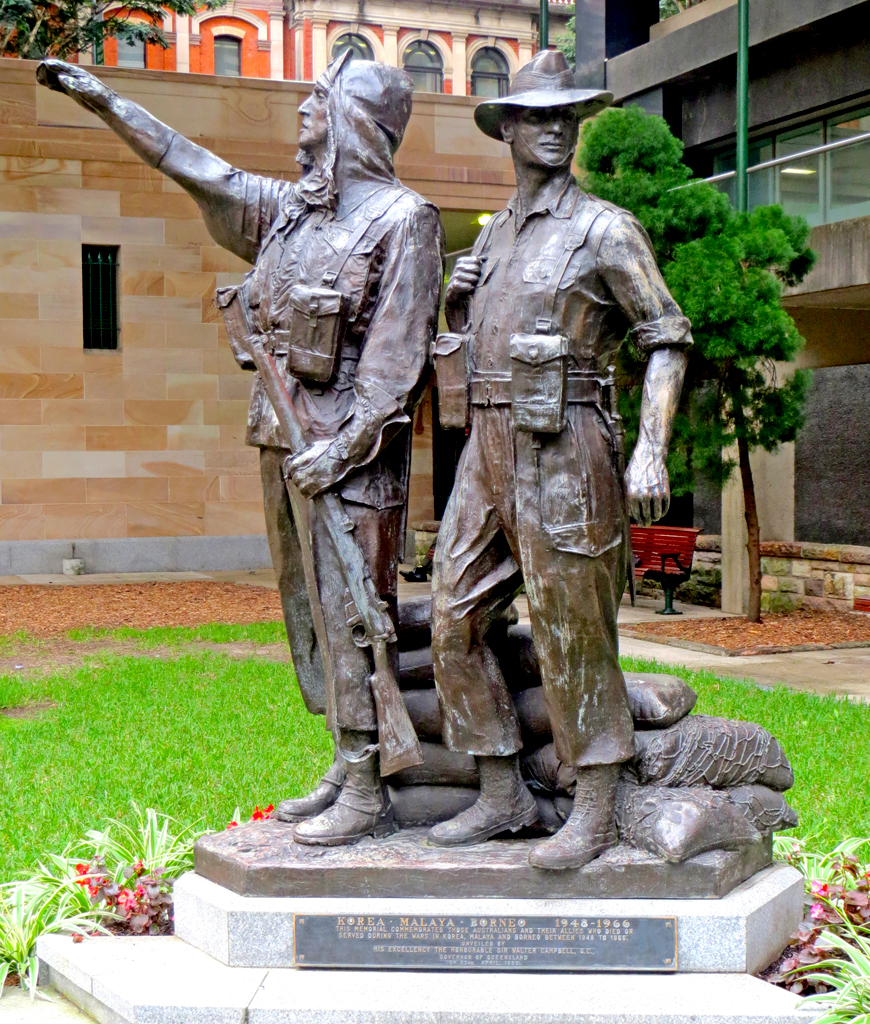
Memorial to Korea, Malaya and Borneo conflicts by Rhyl Hinwood

== Heritage listing ==
Anzac Square was listed on the Queensland Heritage Register on 21 October 1992 having satisfied the following criteria.

The place is important in demonstrating the evolution or pattern of Queensland's history.

Anzac Square, a State memorial to those who participated in overseas armed service campaigns and the site for major commemorative occasions is significant as a rare example formal urban design of such a scale and degree of unity.

The place demonstrates rare, uncommon or endangered aspects of Queensland's cultural heritage.

Anzac Square, a State memorial to those who participated in overseas armed service campaigns and the site for major commemorative occasions is significant as a rare example formal urban design of such a scale and degree of unity.

Anzac Square is significant as one of the few examples of Australian war iconography which include servicewomen.

Anzac Square is significant as it contains the only memorial in Brisbane dedicated to all members of the Queensland contingents who died during the South African conflict, and one of the few South African War memorials in the state.

The place is important because of its aesthetic significance.

Anzac Square, a State memorial to those who participated in overseas armed service campaigns and the site for major commemorative occasions is significant as a rare example formal urban design of such a scale and degree of unity.

Anzac Square is important for its contribution to the central city area as a large open space, combining green and built elements.

Anzac Square is significant as examples of the work of Queensland artists and sculptors Daphne Mayo, L Watts and W L Bowles.

The place has a strong or special association with a particular community or cultural group for social, cultural or spiritual reasons.

Anzac Square, a State memorial to those who participated in overseas armed service campaigns and the site for major commemorative occasions is significant as a rare example formal urban design of such a scale and degree of unity
