= Hundred Days Offensive =

Allied offensive during World War One

- Part of the Western Front of World War I
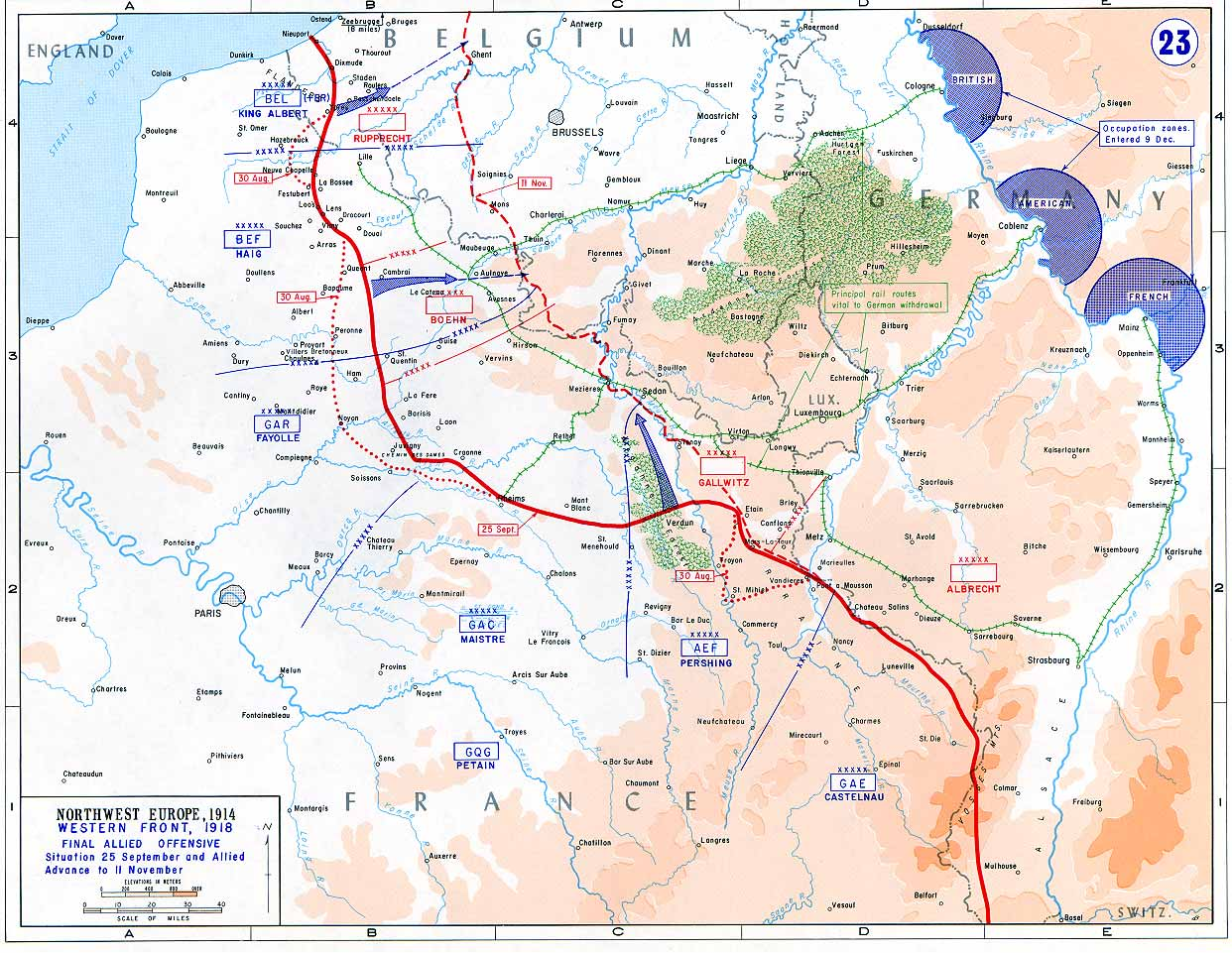
- Allied gains in late 1918
Date	8 August – 11 November 1918 (95 days)
Location	Amiens, France to Mons, Belgium
Result	Allied victory

Belligerents
France British Empire: United Kingdom; Canada; Australia; New Zealand; Newfoundland; South Africa; United States; Belgium; Italy; Portugal (Rattanakosin Kingdom (1782–1932)) Siam	German Empire; Austria-Hungary

Commanders and leaders
(French Third Republic) Ferdinand Foch (Note: Allied Commander) (French Third Republic) Philippe Pétain (Note: Commander of the French Army) (French Third Republic) Paul Maistre (Note: Commander of Army Group Centre) (French Third Republic) Émile Fayolle (Note: Commander of Army Group Reserve) (French Third Republic) Noël Castelnau (Note: Commander of Army Group East) (United Kingdom of Great Britain and Ireland) Douglas Haig (Note: Commander of BEF) (United Kingdom of Great Britain and Ireland) Henry Wilson (Note: Chief of Imperial General Staff of the British Army) (United States) John J. Pershing (Note: Commander of AEF) (Belgium) King Albert I (Note: Commander of Army Group Flanders) (French Third Republic) Jean Degoutte (Note: Chief of Staff of Army Group Flanders)	(German Empire) Paul von Hindenburg (Note: Chief of the German Great General Staff) (German Empire) Erich Ludendorff (Note: First Quartermaster General) (German Empire) Wilhelm Groener (Note: First Quartermaster General) (German Empire) Max von Gallwitz (Note: Commander of Army Group Gallwitz) (German Empire) Prince Rupprecht (Note: Commander of Army Group Rupprecht of Bavaria) (German Empire) Wilhelm of Prussia (Note: Commander of Army Group German Crown Prince) (German Empire) Max von Boehn (Note: Commander of Army Group Boehn) (German Empire) Duke Albrecht (Note: Commander of Army Group Albrecht)

Strength
Strength on 11 November 1918: (French Third Republic) c. 2,559,000 (United Kingdom of Great Britain and Ireland) c. 1,900,000 (United States) c. 1,900,000 (Note: Also possessed 2,251 artillery pieces on the frontline out of the 3,500 total artillery pieces used by the Americans. Ayers p. 81) (Belgium) c. 190,000	Strength on 11 November 1918: (German Empire) c. 3,562,000

Casualties and losses
18 July – 11 November: 1,070,000 (French Third Republic) 531,000 (United Kingdom of Great Britain and Ireland) 412,000 (United States) 127,000	18 July – 11 November: (German Empire) 1,172,075+ 100,000+ killed 685,733 wounded 386,342 captured 6,700 artillery pieces Breakdown: Men and material captured, by country; BEF: 188,700 prisoners, 2,840 guns; French: 139,000 prisoners, 1,880 guns; US: 44,142 prisoners, 1,481 guns; Belgian: 14,500 prisoners, 414 guns; (Austria-Hungary) 17,500; 2,500 killed 5,000 captured 10,000 wounded

The Hundred Days Offensive (8 August to 11 November 1918) was a series of massive Allied offensives that ended the First World War. Beginning with the Battle of Amiens (8–12 August) on the Western Front, the Allies pushed the Imperial German Army back, undoing its gains from the German spring offensive (21 March – 18 July).

The Germans retreated to the Hindenburg Line, but the Allies broke through the line with a series of victories, starting with the Battle of St Quentin Canal on 29 September. The offensive led directly to the Armistice of 11 November 1918 which ended the war with an Allied victory.

The term "Hundred Days Offensive" does not refer to a planned Allied campaign, but rather the rapid series of Allied victories. The offensive actually took 95 days.

== Background ==
The German spring offensive on the Western Front had begun on 21 March 1918 with Operation Michael and had petered out by July. The German Army had advanced to the River Marne, but failed to achieve their aim of a victory that would decide the war. When the German Operation Marne-Rheims ended in July, the Allied supreme commander, Ferdinand Foch, ordered a counter-offensive, which became known as the Second Battle of the Marne. The Germans, recognizing their untenable position, withdrew from the Marne to the north. For this victory, Foch was granted the title Marshal of France.

After the Germans had lost their forward momentum, Foch considered the time had arrived for the Allies to return to the offensive. General Pershing who commanded the American Expeditionary Force (AEF) was keen to use his army as an independent force. The British Expeditionary Force (BEF) had been reinforced by large numbers of troops returned from the Sinai and Palestine campaign and from the Italian front, and by replacements previously held back in Britain by Prime Minister David Lloyd George.

The military planners considered a number of proposals. Foch agreed to a proposal by Field Marshal Sir Douglas Haig, commander-in-chief of the BEF, to strike on the River Somme, east of Amiens and south-west of the site of the 1916 Battle of the Somme, to force the Germans away from the vital Amiens–Paris railway. The Somme was chosen because it remained the boundary between the BEF and the French armies, along the Amiens–Roye road, allowing the two armies to cooperate. The Picardy terrain provided a good surface for tanks, unlike in Flanders, and the defences of the German 2nd Army under General Georg von der Marwitz were relatively weak, having been subjected to continual raiding by the Australians in a process termed peaceful penetration.

== Battles ==
=== Advance in Picardy ===
==== Battle of Amiens ====
The Battle of Amiens (with the French attack on the southern flank called the Battle of Montdidier) opened on 8 August, with an attack by more than 10 Allied divisions—Australian, Canadian, British, and French forces—with more than 500 tanks. The mastermind of the plan was the Australian Lieutenant General John Monash. Through careful preparation, the Allies achieved surprise. The attack, led by the British Fourth Army, broke through the German lines, and tanks attacked German rear positions, sowing panic and confusion. By the end of the day, a gap 15 mi (24 km) wide had been created in the German line south of the Somme. The Allies had taken 17,000 prisoners and 339 guns. Total German losses were estimated to be 30,000 men, while the Allies had suffered about 6,500 killed, wounded and missing. The collapse in German morale led Erich Ludendorff to dub it "the Black Day of the German Army".

The advance continued for three more days but without the spectacular results of 8 August, since the rapid advance outran the supporting artillery and ran short of supplies. During those three days, the Allies had managed to gain 12 mi (19 km). Most of this was taken on the first day as the arrival of German reinforcements after this slowed the Allied advance. On 10 August, the Germans began to pull out of the salient that they had managed to occupy during Operation Michael in March, back towards the Hindenburg Line.

=== Somme ===
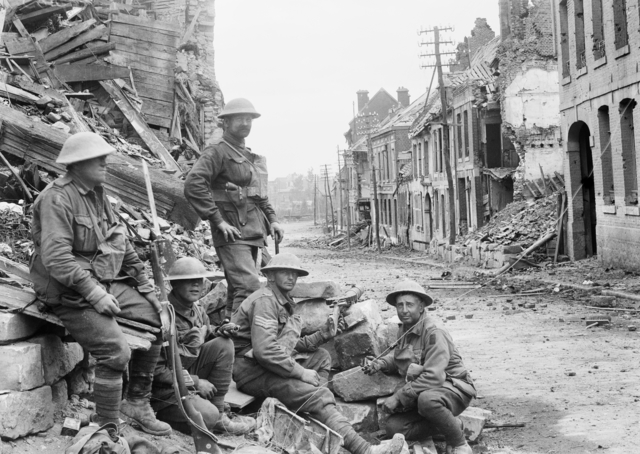
1 September 1918, Péronne, Somme. A machine gun position established by the Australian 54th Battalion during its attack on German forces in the town

Haig refused to continue the attack and instead prepared to launch a fresh offensive by the Third Army at Albert (the Battle of Albert), which opened on 21 August. The offensive was a success, pushing the German 2nd Army back over a 34 mi (55 km) front. Albert was captured on 22 August. The attack was widened on the south, by the French Tenth Army starting the Second Battle of Noyon on 17 August, capturing the town of Noyon on 29 August. On 26 August, to the north of the initial attack, the First Army widened the attack by another 7 mi (11 km) with the Second Battle of Arras of 1918. Bapaume fell on 29 August (during the Second Battle of Bapaume).

=== Advance to the Hindenburg Line ===
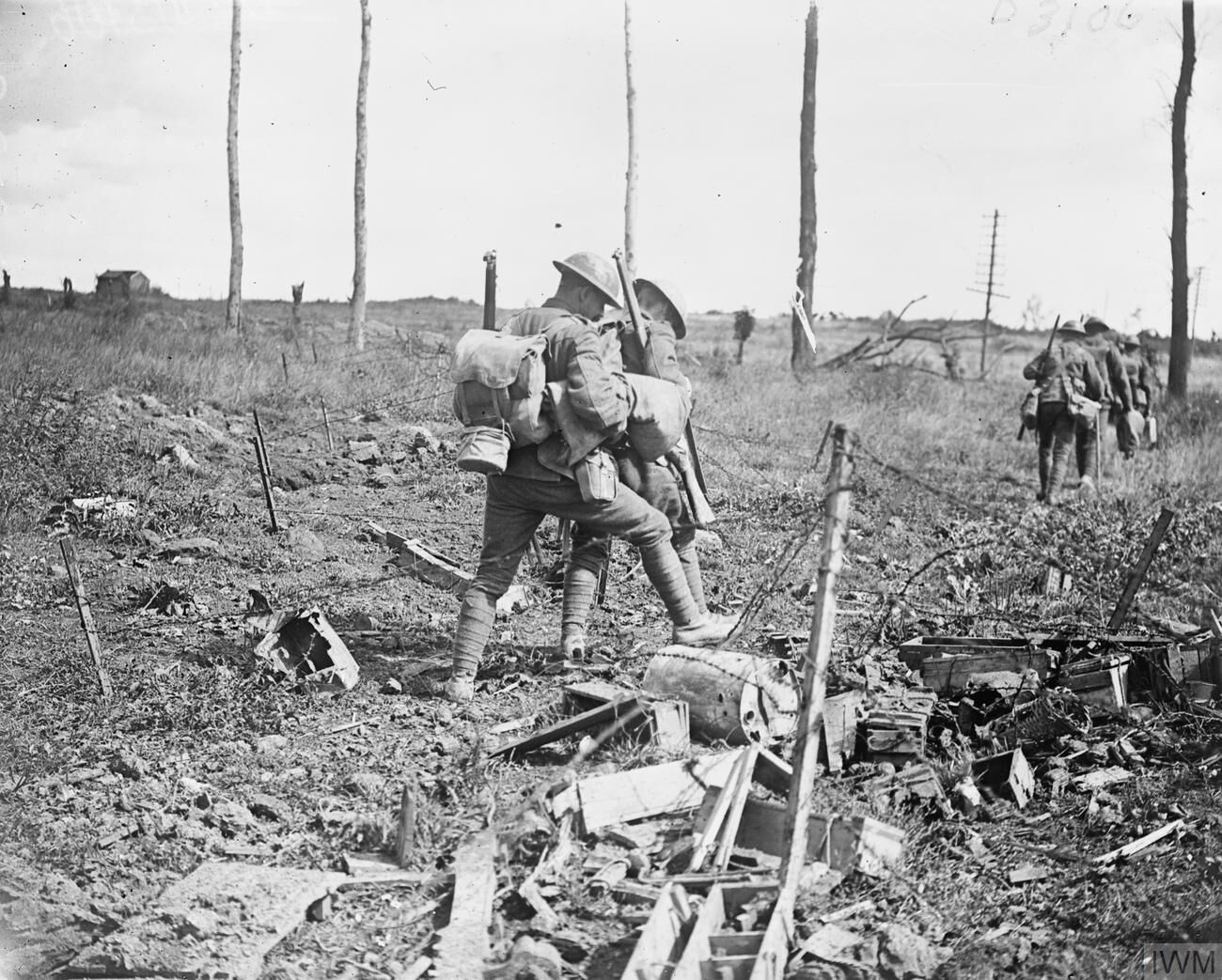
Troops of the Royal Inniskilling Fusiliers, 36th (Ulster) Division, advancing from Ravelsburg Ridge to the outskirts of Neuve Eglise, 1 September 1918

With the front line broken, a number of battles took place as the Allies forced the Germans back to the Hindenburg Line. East of Amiens (after the Battle of Amiens), with artillery brought forward and munitions replenished, the Fourth Army also resumed its advance, with the Australian Corps crossing the Somme River on the night of 31 August, breaking the German lines during the Battle of Mont Saint-Quentin. On 26 August, to the north of the Somme, the First Army widened the attack by another 7 mi (11 km) with the Second Battle of Arras of 1918, which includes the Battle of the Scarpe (1918) (26 August) and the Battle of Drocourt-Queant Line (2 September).

South of the BEF, the French First Army approached the Hindenburg Line on the outskirts of St. Quentin during the Battle of Savy-Dallon (10 September), and the French Tenth Army approached the Hindenburg Line near Laon during the Battle of Vauxaillon (14 September). The British Fourth Army approached the Hindenburg Line along the St Quentin Canal, during the Battle of Épehy (18 September). By 2 September, the Germans had been forced back close to the Hindenburg Line from which they had launched their offensive in the spring.

=== Battles of the Hindenburg Line ===
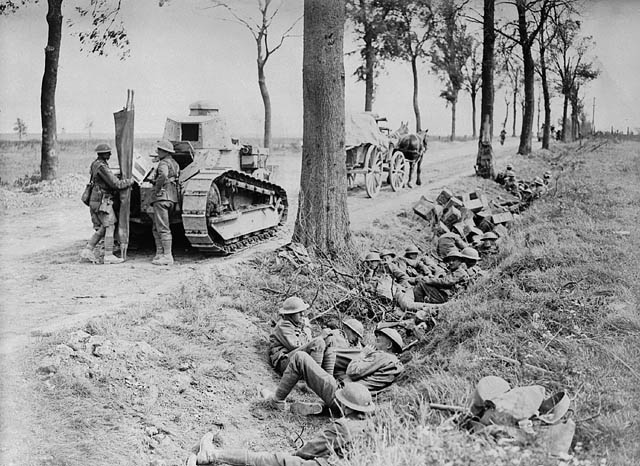
Canadian troops shelter in a ditch along the Arras-Cambrai road

Foch planned a series of concentric attacks on the German lines in France (sometimes referred to as the Grand Offensive), with the various axes of advance designed to cut German lateral communications, intending that the success of an attack would enable the entire front line to be advanced. The main German defences were anchored on the Hindenburg Line, a series of defensive fortifications stretching from Cerny on the Aisne river to Arras. Before Foch's main offensive was launched, the remaining German salients west and east of the line were crushed at Havrincourt and St Mihiel on 12 September and at the Battle of Épehy and the Battle of the Canal du Nord on 27 September.

The first attack of the Grand Offensive was launched on 26 September by the French and the AEF in the Meuse-Argonne Offensive (this offensive includes the battles of Somme-Py, Saint-Thierry, Montfaucon, and Chesne of 1 November). On 28 September, the Army Group under Albert I of Belgium (the Belgian Army, the British Second Army and the French Sixth Army), attacked near Ypres in Flanders (the Fifth Battle of Ypres). Both attacks made good progress initially but were then slowed by supply difficulties. The Grand Offensive involved attacking over difficult terrain, resulting in the Hindenburg Line not being broken until 17 October.

On 29 September, the central attack on the Hindenburg Line commenced, with the British Fourth Army (with British, Australian and American forces) attacking in the Battle of St Quentin Canal and the French First Army attacking fortifications outside St Quentin. By 5 October, the Allies had broken through the entire depth of the Hindenburg defences over a 19 mi (31 km) front. General Rawlinson wrote, "Had the Boche [Germans] not shown marked signs of deterioration during the past month, I should never have contemplated attacking the Hindenburg line. Had it been defended by the Germans of two years ago, it would certainly have been impregnable…."

On 8 October, the First and Third British Armies broke through the Hindenburg Line at the Second Battle of Cambrai, with Cambrai itself falling to the Canadians. This collapse forced the German High Command to accept that the war had to be ended. The evidence of failing German morale also convinced many Allied commanders and political leaders that the war could be ended in 1918; previously, all efforts had been concentrated on building up forces to mount a decisive attack in 1919.

=== Subsequent operations ===
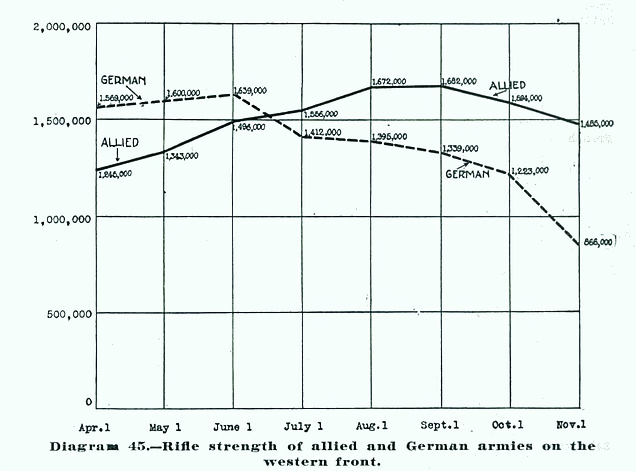
Comparison of Allied and German frontline rifle strength before and after the Hundred Days Offensive and the arrival of additional American troops.

Through October, the German armies retreated through the territory gained in 1914. The Allies pressed the Germans back toward the lateral railway line from Metz to Bruges, which had supplied the front in northern France and Belgium for much of the war. As the Allied armies reached this line, the Germans were forced to abandon increasingly large amounts of heavy equipment and supplies, further reducing their morale and capacity to resist.

The Allied and German armies suffered many casualties. Rearguard actions were fought during the Pursuit to the Selle (9 October), battles of Courtrai (14 October), Mont-d'Origny (15 October), the Selle (17 October), Lys and Escaut (20 October) (including the subsidiary battles of the Lys and of the Escaut), the Serre (20 October), Valenciennes (1 November), the Sambre (including the Second Battle of Guise) (4 November), and Thiérache (4 November), and the Passage of the Grande Honnelle (5 November), with fighting continuing until the Armistice took effect at 11:00 on 11 November 1918. The last soldier to die was Henry Gunther, one minute before the armistice came into effect.

== See also ==
- Canada's Hundred Days

== Bibliography ==
- Bond, Brian (2007). The Unquiet Western Front, Britain's Role in Literature and History. London: Cambridge University Press. ISBN 978-0-521-03641-2.
- Bean, Charles Edwin Woodrow (1942). The Australian Imperial Force in France during the Allied Offensive. Official History of Australia in the War of 1914–1918. Vol. VI. Angus and Robertson. OCLC 41008291.
- Blair, Dale (2011). The Battle of Bellicourt Tunnel: Tommies, Diggers and Doughboys on the Hindenburg Line, 1918. Frontline Books. ISBN 978-1848325876.
- Christie, Norm M. (1999). For King and Empire, The Canadians at Amiens, August 1918. CEF Books. ISBN 1-896979-20-3.
- Christie, Norm M. (2005). The Canadians at Arras and the Drocourt–Queant Line, August–September, 1918. CEF Books. ISBN 1-896979-43-2. OCLC 60369666.
- Christie, Norm M. (1997). The Canadians at Cambrai and the Canal du Nord, August–September 1918. CEF Books. ISBN 1-896979-18-1.
- Dancocks, Daniel George (1987). Spearhead to Victory: Canada and the Great War. Hurtig. ISBN 0-88830-310-6. OCLC 16354705.
- Hanotaux, Gabriel (1924). Histoire Illustrée de la Guerre de 1914 (in French). Vol. 17. Paris: Gounouilhou. OCLC 175115527.
- Livesay, John Frederick Bligh (1919). Canada's Hundred Days. Thomas Allen. OCLC 471474361.
- Lloyd, Nick (2013). Hundred Days: The End of the Great War. Viking. ISBN 978-0-670-92006-8.
- Montgomery, Sir A. (1920). The Story of Fourth Army in the Battles of the Hundred Days, August 8th to November 11th, 1918. London: Hodder & Stoughton. OCLC 682022494.
- Orgill, Douglas (1972). Armoured Onslaught: 8 August 1918. New York: Ballantine. ISBN 0-345-02608-X.
- Priestley, R. E. (1919). Breaking the Hindenburg Line: The Story of the 46th (North Midland) Division. London: Unwin. OCLC 671679006.
- Reid, Walter (2006). Architect of Victory: Douglas Haig. Birlinn Ltd. ISBN 978-1841585178.
- Schreiber, Shane B. (2004). Shock Army of the British Empire: The Canadian Corps in the Last 100 Days of the Great War. St.Catharine's, Ontario: Vanwell. ISBN 1-55125-096-9.
- Tucker, S. (2014). Zabecki, D. (ed.). Germany at War: 400 Years of Military History. ABC-CLIO. ISBN 978-1-598-84980-6.
