= World War I defences of Australia =

While Australia was distant from the main theatres of World War I, small military forces were maintained to defend the country from attack throughout the war. German raiders were considered the main threat, though there was also concern about acts of sabotage.

== Background ==
In the years before World War I, the Australian Government began the process of raising a large civilian militia to defend the country against a feared attack by Japan. This force was based on conscription, and was intended to be complete in 1920. The resources devoted to this plan greatly exceeded those allocated to preparations to raise an expeditionary force to serve outside Australia.

The Australian Government also expanded the pre-Federation network of coastal defences to provide protection against raids from Japanese or German warships prior to World War I. In 1912, these defences were manned by 14 companies of the Australian Garrison Artillery, each of which had a strength of over 100 men.

== Garrison forces ==
=== Mobilisation during 1914 ===
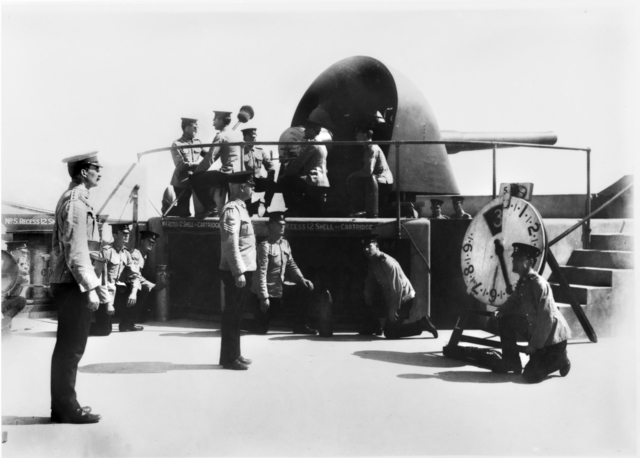
The 6 inch Mk VII gun at Fort Nepean which fired on SS Pfalz. This posed photograph was probably taken shortly after the incident on 5 August 1914.

All coastal defence batteries were activated hours before the declaration of war against Germany (which took place at 9:00 am Melbourne time on 4 August). The next morning, a 6-inch gun from the examination battery at Fort Nepean, which was located at the opening of Port Phillip Bay, fired a shell over the bows of the German cargo ship SS Pfalz after its Australian pilot failed to notice a signal for the ship to stop. Pfalz subsequently steamed into nearby Portsea, and was secured by a naval boarding party. This was the only shot to be fired at an enemy vessel in Australian waters during the war, and may have been the first shot fired by the armies of the British Empire during the war.

The militia members of the garrison units received call-up notices on 6 August, and reported for duty at 9 am the next day. During the early days of August all coastal fortifications were fully manned by gunners, engineers and infantrymen. The gunners remained at their stations for the rest of the year, as it was feared that the German armoured cruisers Scharnhorst and Gneisenau could attack Australia. In addition to the coastal defences in Australia, a battery of four 4.7 inch guns manned by naval personnel was established to protect the town of Rabaul in New Britain in March 1915; this town had been captured from German forces in September 1914.

After the initial call-up of reservists to man the garrison artillery, the commanding officers of the other militia units were directed to begin preparations to raise an infantry division and a light horse division for home defence tasks. By the end of August 1914 the Government had judged that a force of this size was unnecessary given that Australia was distant from the war zones. Instead, it was decided to maintain only a small number of infantry battalions and light horse regiments on active duty at any one time. By the end of 1914 the home defence force comprised 100,000 reservists, of whom 56,000 were members of the Citizens Forces and 51,000 were rifle club volunteers. Despite fears of sabotage and uprisings by German-Australians, no domestic threat eventuated. However, on 1 January 1915 twenty members of the 82nd Infantry Battalion assisted the police to kill two men who fired on picnickers during the "Battle of Broken Hill".

Members of the coastal artillery units were not initially permitted to volunteer for overseas service in the Australian Imperial Force (AIF). However, the threat of naval attack from German raiders greatly decreased after the British victory in the Battle of the Falkland Islands on 8 December 1914, and in early 1915 the Australian Government decided to form a heavy artillery brigade (which was eventually designated the 36th (Australian) Heavy Artillery Group) for service in France from the permanent members of the garrison artillery units.

=== Garrison duties ===
For the remainder of the war the Australian Government was concerned that German surface raiders or submarines could enter Australian waters, or that Japan could start a war in the Pacific if the Allied forces in France suffered a significant defeat. To guard against these threats, reserve infantry and artillery units were periodically activated for garrison duties. A total of between 3,000 and 4,000 soldiers were on active service at any point in time. As well as manning coastal defences, these soldiers patrolled the coastline near major cities and guarded vital infrastructure such as water reservoirs and undersea telegraph cable landing points. The coastal defences were generally manned on a skeleton basis, though reservists were available to fully activate them if a threat developed. The restriction on coastal artillery personnel serving overseas was relaxed in early 1915, when the Australian Government decided to form a heavy artillery brigade for service in France, initially drawing on permanent members of the garrison artillery. The unit was later designated the 36th (Australian) Heavy Artillery Group.

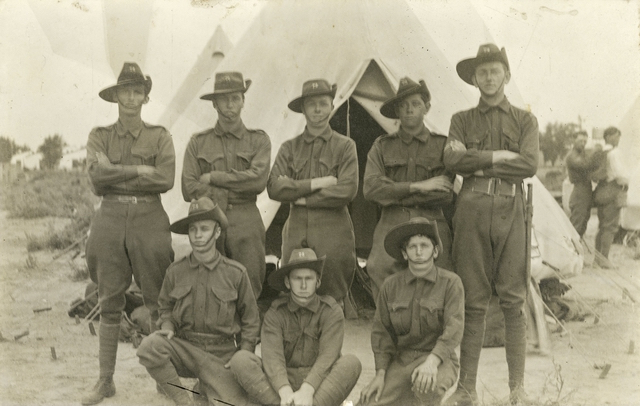
A group portrait of several men from the 74th (Boothby) Regiment during a training camp in or about 1915

The Citizen Forces deteriorated during the war as the AIF was given precedence for manpower and other resources. While the size of the force increased during 1915, a high proportion of its members volunteered for overseas service with the AIF. Many of the militia's officers were used to train AIF recruits, and camp facilities and equipment were also assigned to the expeditionary force. This greatly disrupted the Citizen Forces training activities, with few units conducting training camps during late 1915 or 1916. While there were intakes of conscripts to the Citizen Forces during 1916 and 1917, few of these men were ever required to undertake periods of training or active service. In October 1916 the government called up 37,000 reservists for a short period of compulsory training ahead of a plebiscite on whether conscripts should be compelled to serve overseas. Both this plebiscite and a second vote in 1917 ended in the rejection of the Government's proposal that conscripts be used to reinforce the AIF. By 1918 the Citizen Forces were close to collapse as many of its best members had transferred to the AIF and the remaining personnel were largely untrained.

The Government attempted to revive the Citizen Forces during the last months of the war. The initially successful German spring offensive which began in March led to concerns that Japan could attack Australia. In response, the Government reinstated regular training camps for militia units and launched a campaign to encourage men rejected by the AIF to volunteer for the militia. This effort proved unsuccessful as both reservists and their employers considered the training camps to be pointless and disruptive to the economy, and only 500 men chose to volunteer for the Citizen Forces. While a scheme to set up a reserve force manned by AIF veterans who had returned to Australia attracted 17,000 volunteers, they received no training.

Two partial mobilisations of the garrison forces took place when it was feared that German raiders were operating in Australian waters. The first of these mobilisations occurred between February and April 1916, and led to the coastal defences being fully manned. After this time only the examination batteries at major ports, which were used to force vessels to stop and be searched if ever necessary, were manned. On 20 November 1917, one of the coastal guns at Fremantle fired on the Japanese cruiser Yahagi when she gave an incorrect signal while entering the port. The Australian Governor-General subsequently travelled to Perth to apologise to Yahagi's captain for this incident. The coastal defences were activated again between 21 April and 16 May 1918 when the raider SMS Wolf was thought to be operating near Australia. The examination batteries were stood down on 21 November 1918.

== Naval forces ==
During the war the Royal Australian Navy took up a large number of small ships to serve as patrol boats, though many served for only short periods. These craft were used to patrol coastal waters and harbours for German raiders and mines. In early 1917 the RAN began to organise a minesweeping force using small craft manned by a combination of naval and civilian personnel; 18 vessels were eventually used as auxiliary minesweepers. These vessels were subsequently used to sweep for mines laid by the Wolf off the Australian south-east coast. During the war a Naval Guard Section was also raised to provide security for ships in port and to protect wireless stations.

== See also ==
- Military history of Australia during World War I
- 1st Special Squadron (Japanese Navy)
